

574001–574100 

|-bgcolor=#E9E9E9
| 574001 ||  || — || November 24, 2009 || Kitt Peak || Spacewatch ||  || align=right | 2.1 km || 
|-id=002 bgcolor=#d6d6d6
| 574002 ||  || — || November 10, 1999 || Kitt Peak || Spacewatch ||  || align=right | 2.2 km || 
|-id=003 bgcolor=#E9E9E9
| 574003 ||  || — || November 27, 2009 || Kitt Peak || Spacewatch ||  || align=right data-sort-value="0.94" | 940 m || 
|-id=004 bgcolor=#E9E9E9
| 574004 ||  || — || August 20, 2017 || Haleakala || Pan-STARRS ||  || align=right | 1.1 km || 
|-id=005 bgcolor=#E9E9E9
| 574005 ||  || — || November 16, 2009 || Mount Lemmon || Mount Lemmon Survey ||  || align=right | 2.0 km || 
|-id=006 bgcolor=#d6d6d6
| 574006 ||  || — || November 3, 2014 || Mount Lemmon || Mount Lemmon Survey ||  || align=right | 2.3 km || 
|-id=007 bgcolor=#E9E9E9
| 574007 ||  || — || April 13, 2011 || Mount Lemmon || Mount Lemmon Survey ||  || align=right | 1.3 km || 
|-id=008 bgcolor=#E9E9E9
| 574008 ||  || — || November 21, 2009 || Kitt Peak || Spacewatch ||  || align=right | 1.8 km || 
|-id=009 bgcolor=#E9E9E9
| 574009 ||  || — || November 24, 2009 || Kitt Peak || Spacewatch ||  || align=right data-sort-value="0.75" | 750 m || 
|-id=010 bgcolor=#E9E9E9
| 574010 ||  || — || November 17, 2009 || Kitt Peak || Spacewatch ||  || align=right | 1.3 km || 
|-id=011 bgcolor=#E9E9E9
| 574011 ||  || — || November 17, 2009 || Mount Lemmon || Mount Lemmon Survey ||  || align=right | 2.0 km || 
|-id=012 bgcolor=#E9E9E9
| 574012 ||  || — || November 17, 2009 || Kitt Peak || Spacewatch ||  || align=right | 2.2 km || 
|-id=013 bgcolor=#E9E9E9
| 574013 ||  || — || October 7, 2004 || Kitt Peak || Spacewatch ||  || align=right | 2.1 km || 
|-id=014 bgcolor=#E9E9E9
| 574014 ||  || — || December 11, 2009 || Mount Lemmon || Mount Lemmon Survey ||  || align=right | 1.3 km || 
|-id=015 bgcolor=#E9E9E9
| 574015 ||  || — || April 11, 2003 || Kitt Peak || Spacewatch ||  || align=right data-sort-value="0.97" | 970 m || 
|-id=016 bgcolor=#E9E9E9
| 574016 ||  || — || December 12, 2009 || Tzec Maun || D. Chestnov, A. Novichonok ||  || align=right | 1.6 km || 
|-id=017 bgcolor=#d6d6d6
| 574017 ||  || — || December 9, 2009 || La Sagra || OAM Obs. ||  || align=right | 2.5 km || 
|-id=018 bgcolor=#E9E9E9
| 574018 ||  || — || November 8, 2009 || Mount Lemmon || Mount Lemmon Survey ||  || align=right | 1.2 km || 
|-id=019 bgcolor=#fefefe
| 574019 ||  || — || December 10, 2009 || Mount Lemmon || Mount Lemmon Survey ||  || align=right data-sort-value="0.63" | 630 m || 
|-id=020 bgcolor=#E9E9E9
| 574020 ||  || — || November 8, 2009 || Kitt Peak || Spacewatch ||  || align=right | 1.1 km || 
|-id=021 bgcolor=#E9E9E9
| 574021 ||  || — || November 11, 2009 || Mount Lemmon || Mount Lemmon Survey ||  || align=right | 2.7 km || 
|-id=022 bgcolor=#E9E9E9
| 574022 ||  || — || December 12, 2009 || Pla D'Arguines || R. Ferrando, M. Ferrando ||  || align=right | 2.1 km || 
|-id=023 bgcolor=#E9E9E9
| 574023 ||  || — || May 26, 2007 || Mount Lemmon || Mount Lemmon Survey ||  || align=right | 2.2 km || 
|-id=024 bgcolor=#E9E9E9
| 574024 ||  || — || December 15, 2009 || Mount Lemmon || Mount Lemmon Survey ||  || align=right | 1.8 km || 
|-id=025 bgcolor=#E9E9E9
| 574025 ||  || — || November 23, 2009 || Catalina || CSS ||  || align=right data-sort-value="0.98" | 980 m || 
|-id=026 bgcolor=#E9E9E9
| 574026 ||  || — || December 13, 2009 || Mount Lemmon || Mount Lemmon Survey ||  || align=right | 1.9 km || 
|-id=027 bgcolor=#E9E9E9
| 574027 ||  || — || December 15, 2009 || Mount Lemmon || Mount Lemmon Survey ||  || align=right | 1.0 km || 
|-id=028 bgcolor=#E9E9E9
| 574028 ||  || — || January 18, 2015 || Kitt Peak || Spacewatch ||  || align=right | 1.4 km || 
|-id=029 bgcolor=#E9E9E9
| 574029 ||  || — || December 10, 2009 || Mount Lemmon || Mount Lemmon Survey ||  || align=right | 1.8 km || 
|-id=030 bgcolor=#E9E9E9
| 574030 ||  || — || November 8, 2009 || Kitt Peak || Spacewatch ||  || align=right | 1.9 km || 
|-id=031 bgcolor=#E9E9E9
| 574031 ||  || — || October 23, 2004 || Kitt Peak || Spacewatch ||  || align=right | 1.8 km || 
|-id=032 bgcolor=#E9E9E9
| 574032 ||  || — || August 5, 2008 || Siding Spring || SSS ||  || align=right | 1.5 km || 
|-id=033 bgcolor=#E9E9E9
| 574033 ||  || — || December 17, 2009 || Kitt Peak || Spacewatch ||  || align=right | 1.9 km || 
|-id=034 bgcolor=#E9E9E9
| 574034 ||  || — || September 23, 2003 || Palomar || NEAT ||  || align=right | 3.7 km || 
|-id=035 bgcolor=#E9E9E9
| 574035 ||  || — || December 20, 2009 || Kitt Peak || Spacewatch ||  || align=right | 1.9 km || 
|-id=036 bgcolor=#E9E9E9
| 574036 ||  || — || December 24, 2009 || Tzec Maun || D. Chestnov, A. Novichonok ||  || align=right | 1.8 km || 
|-id=037 bgcolor=#E9E9E9
| 574037 ||  || — || December 18, 2009 || Mount Lemmon || Mount Lemmon Survey ||  || align=right | 1.7 km || 
|-id=038 bgcolor=#fefefe
| 574038 ||  || — || August 27, 2005 || Palomar || NEAT ||  || align=right data-sort-value="0.79" | 790 m || 
|-id=039 bgcolor=#E9E9E9
| 574039 ||  || — || December 17, 2009 || Kitt Peak || Spacewatch ||  || align=right | 1.4 km || 
|-id=040 bgcolor=#E9E9E9
| 574040 ||  || — || December 18, 2009 || Mount Lemmon || Mount Lemmon Survey ||  || align=right | 1.8 km || 
|-id=041 bgcolor=#E9E9E9
| 574041 ||  || — || August 11, 2004 || Siding Spring || SSS ||  || align=right | 1.5 km || 
|-id=042 bgcolor=#E9E9E9
| 574042 ||  || — || November 9, 2013 || Mount Lemmon || Mount Lemmon Survey ||  || align=right data-sort-value="0.98" | 980 m || 
|-id=043 bgcolor=#E9E9E9
| 574043 ||  || — || November 27, 2013 || Haleakala || Pan-STARRS ||  || align=right | 2.4 km || 
|-id=044 bgcolor=#E9E9E9
| 574044 ||  || — || December 18, 2009 || Mount Lemmon || Mount Lemmon Survey ||  || align=right | 1.2 km || 
|-id=045 bgcolor=#E9E9E9
| 574045 ||  || — || January 15, 2015 || Haleakala || Pan-STARRS ||  || align=right | 1.8 km || 
|-id=046 bgcolor=#E9E9E9
| 574046 ||  || — || November 20, 2009 || Mount Lemmon || Mount Lemmon Survey ||  || align=right | 2.2 km || 
|-id=047 bgcolor=#E9E9E9
| 574047 ||  || — || November 28, 2013 || Kitt Peak || Spacewatch ||  || align=right | 1.7 km || 
|-id=048 bgcolor=#d6d6d6
| 574048 ||  || — || December 20, 2009 || Mount Lemmon || Mount Lemmon Survey ||  || align=right | 2.0 km || 
|-id=049 bgcolor=#E9E9E9
| 574049 ||  || — || December 17, 2009 || Kitt Peak || Spacewatch ||  || align=right | 1.5 km || 
|-id=050 bgcolor=#E9E9E9
| 574050 ||  || — || December 19, 2009 || Mount Lemmon || Mount Lemmon Survey ||  || align=right | 1.8 km || 
|-id=051 bgcolor=#fefefe
| 574051 ||  || — || January 5, 2010 || Kitt Peak || Spacewatch ||  || align=right data-sort-value="0.67" | 670 m || 
|-id=052 bgcolor=#E9E9E9
| 574052 ||  || — || November 11, 2009 || Mount Lemmon || Mount Lemmon Survey ||  || align=right | 1.7 km || 
|-id=053 bgcolor=#E9E9E9
| 574053 ||  || — || October 17, 1995 || Kitt Peak || Spacewatch ||  || align=right | 1.8 km || 
|-id=054 bgcolor=#E9E9E9
| 574054 ||  || — || January 7, 2010 || Mount Lemmon || Mount Lemmon Survey ||  || align=right data-sort-value="0.92" | 920 m || 
|-id=055 bgcolor=#E9E9E9
| 574055 ||  || — || December 19, 2009 || Kitt Peak || Spacewatch ||  || align=right | 2.5 km || 
|-id=056 bgcolor=#E9E9E9
| 574056 ||  || — || September 7, 2008 || Catalina || CSS ||  || align=right | 2.2 km || 
|-id=057 bgcolor=#E9E9E9
| 574057 ||  || — || January 6, 2010 || Kitt Peak || Spacewatch ||  || align=right | 2.4 km || 
|-id=058 bgcolor=#E9E9E9
| 574058 ||  || — || September 24, 2008 || Mount Lemmon || Mount Lemmon Survey ||  || align=right | 1.8 km || 
|-id=059 bgcolor=#E9E9E9
| 574059 ||  || — || January 6, 2010 || Kitt Peak || Spacewatch ||  || align=right | 1.8 km || 
|-id=060 bgcolor=#E9E9E9
| 574060 ||  || — || November 21, 2009 || Mount Lemmon || Mount Lemmon Survey ||  || align=right | 2.6 km || 
|-id=061 bgcolor=#E9E9E9
| 574061 ||  || — || December 20, 2004 || Mount Lemmon || Mount Lemmon Survey ||  || align=right | 2.6 km || 
|-id=062 bgcolor=#E9E9E9
| 574062 ||  || — || November 16, 2009 || Mount Lemmon || Mount Lemmon Survey ||  || align=right | 2.0 km || 
|-id=063 bgcolor=#E9E9E9
| 574063 ||  || — || November 16, 2009 || Kitt Peak || Spacewatch ||  || align=right | 2.3 km || 
|-id=064 bgcolor=#fefefe
| 574064 ||  || — || January 5, 2010 || Kitt Peak || Spacewatch ||  || align=right data-sort-value="0.78" | 780 m || 
|-id=065 bgcolor=#fefefe
| 574065 ||  || — || January 6, 2010 || Kitt Peak || Spacewatch ||  || align=right data-sort-value="0.70" | 700 m || 
|-id=066 bgcolor=#E9E9E9
| 574066 ||  || — || January 7, 2010 || Kitt Peak || Spacewatch ||  || align=right data-sort-value="0.89" | 890 m || 
|-id=067 bgcolor=#fefefe
| 574067 ||  || — || January 7, 2010 || Kitt Peak || Spacewatch ||  || align=right data-sort-value="0.85" | 850 m || 
|-id=068 bgcolor=#E9E9E9
| 574068 ||  || — || January 7, 2010 || Kitt Peak || Spacewatch ||  || align=right | 2.0 km || 
|-id=069 bgcolor=#E9E9E9
| 574069 ||  || — || January 7, 2010 || Kitt Peak || Spacewatch ||  || align=right | 1.7 km || 
|-id=070 bgcolor=#E9E9E9
| 574070 ||  || — || January 7, 2010 || Mount Lemmon || Mount Lemmon Survey ||  || align=right | 1.7 km || 
|-id=071 bgcolor=#E9E9E9
| 574071 ||  || — || December 15, 2009 || Mount Lemmon || Mount Lemmon Survey ||  || align=right | 1.7 km || 
|-id=072 bgcolor=#fefefe
| 574072 ||  || — || January 8, 2010 || Kitt Peak || Spacewatch ||  || align=right data-sort-value="0.52" | 520 m || 
|-id=073 bgcolor=#E9E9E9
| 574073 ||  || — || January 30, 2006 || Kitt Peak || Spacewatch ||  || align=right | 1.1 km || 
|-id=074 bgcolor=#E9E9E9
| 574074 ||  || — || December 20, 2004 || Kitt Peak || Spacewatch ||  || align=right | 2.9 km || 
|-id=075 bgcolor=#E9E9E9
| 574075 ||  || — || October 20, 2008 || Mount Lemmon || Mount Lemmon Survey ||  || align=right | 1.4 km || 
|-id=076 bgcolor=#E9E9E9
| 574076 ||  || — || January 8, 2010 || Kitt Peak || Spacewatch ||  || align=right | 1.8 km || 
|-id=077 bgcolor=#E9E9E9
| 574077 ||  || — || September 3, 2008 || Kitt Peak || Spacewatch ||  || align=right | 1.7 km || 
|-id=078 bgcolor=#E9E9E9
| 574078 ||  || — || March 23, 2002 || Kitt Peak || Spacewatch ||  || align=right data-sort-value="0.97" | 970 m || 
|-id=079 bgcolor=#E9E9E9
| 574079 ||  || — || February 24, 2006 || Kitt Peak || Spacewatch ||  || align=right | 2.2 km || 
|-id=080 bgcolor=#fefefe
| 574080 ||  || — || January 11, 2010 || Kitt Peak || Spacewatch ||  || align=right data-sort-value="0.71" | 710 m || 
|-id=081 bgcolor=#E9E9E9
| 574081 ||  || — || January 11, 2010 || Kitt Peak || Spacewatch ||  || align=right | 2.8 km || 
|-id=082 bgcolor=#fefefe
| 574082 ||  || — || December 16, 2009 || Kitt Peak || Spacewatch ||  || align=right data-sort-value="0.71" | 710 m || 
|-id=083 bgcolor=#E9E9E9
| 574083 ||  || — || December 11, 2004 || Kitt Peak || Spacewatch ||  || align=right | 2.3 km || 
|-id=084 bgcolor=#E9E9E9
| 574084 ||  || — || December 18, 2009 || Kitt Peak || Spacewatch ||  || align=right | 2.1 km || 
|-id=085 bgcolor=#E9E9E9
| 574085 ||  || — || January 7, 2010 || Kitt Peak || Spacewatch ||  || align=right | 1.5 km || 
|-id=086 bgcolor=#E9E9E9
| 574086 ||  || — || January 8, 2010 || Mount Lemmon || Mount Lemmon Survey ||  || align=right | 1.8 km || 
|-id=087 bgcolor=#E9E9E9
| 574087 ||  || — || December 1, 2014 || Haleakala || Pan-STARRS ||  || align=right | 1.3 km || 
|-id=088 bgcolor=#E9E9E9
| 574088 ||  || — || February 6, 2014 || Catalina || CSS ||  || align=right | 2.6 km || 
|-id=089 bgcolor=#E9E9E9
| 574089 ||  || — || November 8, 2013 || Catalina || CSS ||  || align=right | 1.8 km || 
|-id=090 bgcolor=#E9E9E9
| 574090 ||  || — || August 31, 2017 || Haleakala || Pan-STARRS ||  || align=right | 1.4 km || 
|-id=091 bgcolor=#E9E9E9
| 574091 ||  || — || January 21, 2015 || Haleakala || Pan-STARRS ||  || align=right | 1.5 km || 
|-id=092 bgcolor=#E9E9E9
| 574092 ||  || — || November 9, 2013 || Haleakala || Pan-STARRS ||  || align=right | 1.5 km || 
|-id=093 bgcolor=#E9E9E9
| 574093 ||  || — || January 12, 2010 || Mount Lemmon || Mount Lemmon Survey ||  || align=right | 1.7 km || 
|-id=094 bgcolor=#fefefe
| 574094 ||  || — || January 6, 2010 || Kitt Peak || Spacewatch ||  || align=right data-sort-value="0.65" | 650 m || 
|-id=095 bgcolor=#fefefe
| 574095 ||  || — || January 7, 2010 || Mount Lemmon || Mount Lemmon Survey ||  || align=right data-sort-value="0.67" | 670 m || 
|-id=096 bgcolor=#E9E9E9
| 574096 ||  || — || January 6, 2010 || Kitt Peak || Spacewatch ||  || align=right | 2.0 km || 
|-id=097 bgcolor=#E9E9E9
| 574097 ||  || — || January 8, 2010 || Kitt Peak || Spacewatch ||  || align=right | 1.0 km || 
|-id=098 bgcolor=#fefefe
| 574098 ||  || — || January 6, 2010 || Kitt Peak || Spacewatch ||  || align=right data-sort-value="0.51" | 510 m || 
|-id=099 bgcolor=#fefefe
| 574099 ||  || — || January 11, 2010 || Kitt Peak || Spacewatch ||  || align=right data-sort-value="0.59" | 590 m || 
|-id=100 bgcolor=#d6d6d6
| 574100 ||  || — || January 7, 2010 || Kitt Peak || Spacewatch ||  || align=right | 2.0 km || 
|}

574101–574200 

|-bgcolor=#E9E9E9
| 574101 ||  || — || December 22, 2008 || Mount Lemmon || Mount Lemmon Survey ||  || align=right | 1.1 km || 
|-id=102 bgcolor=#E9E9E9
| 574102 ||  || — || December 26, 2014 || Haleakala || Pan-STARRS ||  || align=right | 1.4 km || 
|-id=103 bgcolor=#d6d6d6
| 574103 ||  || — || August 14, 2014 || Haleakala || Pan-STARRS ||  || align=right | 2.8 km || 
|-id=104 bgcolor=#fefefe
| 574104 ||  || — || February 8, 2010 || Kitt Peak || Spacewatch ||  || align=right data-sort-value="0.57" | 570 m || 
|-id=105 bgcolor=#E9E9E9
| 574105 ||  || — || February 12, 2010 || Dauban || C. Rinner, F. Kugel ||  || align=right | 3.0 km || 
|-id=106 bgcolor=#E9E9E9
| 574106 ||  || — || December 18, 2009 || Kitt Peak || Spacewatch ||  || align=right | 1.2 km || 
|-id=107 bgcolor=#E9E9E9
| 574107 ||  || — || October 21, 2003 || Kitt Peak || Spacewatch ||  || align=right | 2.2 km || 
|-id=108 bgcolor=#E9E9E9
| 574108 ||  || — || January 19, 2010 || Tzec Maun || D. Chestnov, A. Novichonok ||  || align=right | 1.2 km || 
|-id=109 bgcolor=#E9E9E9
| 574109 ||  || — || January 7, 2010 || Kitt Peak || Spacewatch ||  || align=right | 1.9 km || 
|-id=110 bgcolor=#E9E9E9
| 574110 ||  || — || September 18, 2003 || Kitt Peak || Spacewatch ||  || align=right | 2.1 km || 
|-id=111 bgcolor=#E9E9E9
| 574111 ||  || — || September 29, 2008 || Kitt Peak || Spacewatch ||  || align=right | 1.7 km || 
|-id=112 bgcolor=#E9E9E9
| 574112 ||  || — || February 9, 2010 || Mount Lemmon || Mount Lemmon Survey ||  || align=right | 1.5 km || 
|-id=113 bgcolor=#E9E9E9
| 574113 ||  || — || September 6, 2008 || Kitt Peak || Spacewatch ||  || align=right | 1.2 km || 
|-id=114 bgcolor=#fefefe
| 574114 ||  || — || January 15, 2010 || Kitt Peak || Spacewatch ||  || align=right data-sort-value="0.73" | 730 m || 
|-id=115 bgcolor=#E9E9E9
| 574115 ||  || — || February 10, 2010 || Kitt Peak || Spacewatch ||  || align=right | 2.4 km || 
|-id=116 bgcolor=#E9E9E9
| 574116 ||  || — || November 16, 2003 || Kitt Peak || Spacewatch ||  || align=right | 2.3 km || 
|-id=117 bgcolor=#d6d6d6
| 574117 ||  || — || February 13, 2010 || Kitt Peak || Spacewatch || 3:2 || align=right | 4.4 km || 
|-id=118 bgcolor=#d6d6d6
| 574118 ||  || — || October 28, 2008 || Mount Lemmon || Mount Lemmon Survey ||  || align=right | 1.8 km || 
|-id=119 bgcolor=#E9E9E9
| 574119 ||  || — || August 28, 2003 || Palomar || NEAT ||  || align=right | 2.2 km || 
|-id=120 bgcolor=#d6d6d6
| 574120 ||  || — || February 13, 2010 || Mount Lemmon || Mount Lemmon Survey ||  || align=right | 1.8 km || 
|-id=121 bgcolor=#E9E9E9
| 574121 ||  || — || February 9, 2010 || Catalina || CSS ||  || align=right | 1.4 km || 
|-id=122 bgcolor=#E9E9E9
| 574122 ||  || — || January 15, 2005 || Bareggio || V. Pozzoli ||  || align=right | 3.0 km || 
|-id=123 bgcolor=#fefefe
| 574123 ||  || — || February 10, 2010 || Kitt Peak || Spacewatch ||  || align=right data-sort-value="0.62" | 620 m || 
|-id=124 bgcolor=#E9E9E9
| 574124 ||  || — || February 10, 2010 || Kitt Peak || Spacewatch ||  || align=right data-sort-value="0.63" | 630 m || 
|-id=125 bgcolor=#E9E9E9
| 574125 ||  || — || January 7, 2010 || Kitt Peak || Spacewatch ||  || align=right | 1.7 km || 
|-id=126 bgcolor=#E9E9E9
| 574126 ||  || — || January 12, 2010 || Mount Lemmon || Mount Lemmon Survey ||  || align=right | 2.4 km || 
|-id=127 bgcolor=#fefefe
| 574127 ||  || — || February 13, 2010 || Mount Lemmon || Mount Lemmon Survey ||  || align=right data-sort-value="0.67" | 670 m || 
|-id=128 bgcolor=#E9E9E9
| 574128 ||  || — || July 19, 2007 || Mount Lemmon || Mount Lemmon Survey ||  || align=right | 2.1 km || 
|-id=129 bgcolor=#E9E9E9
| 574129 ||  || — || February 13, 2010 || Mount Lemmon || Mount Lemmon Survey ||  || align=right | 1.9 km || 
|-id=130 bgcolor=#E9E9E9
| 574130 ||  || — || February 13, 2010 || Mount Lemmon || Mount Lemmon Survey ||  || align=right | 1.8 km || 
|-id=131 bgcolor=#fefefe
| 574131 ||  || — || September 23, 2008 || Kitt Peak || Spacewatch ||  || align=right data-sort-value="0.82" | 820 m || 
|-id=132 bgcolor=#d6d6d6
| 574132 ||  || — || February 14, 2010 || Mount Lemmon || Mount Lemmon Survey ||  || align=right | 2.4 km || 
|-id=133 bgcolor=#E9E9E9
| 574133 ||  || — || September 21, 2003 || Kitt Peak || Spacewatch ||  || align=right | 2.2 km || 
|-id=134 bgcolor=#E9E9E9
| 574134 ||  || — || January 18, 2005 || Kitt Peak || Spacewatch ||  || align=right | 1.9 km || 
|-id=135 bgcolor=#fefefe
| 574135 ||  || — || September 5, 2008 || Kitt Peak || Spacewatch ||  || align=right data-sort-value="0.71" | 710 m || 
|-id=136 bgcolor=#d6d6d6
| 574136 ||  || — || February 14, 2010 || Mount Lemmon || Mount Lemmon Survey ||  || align=right | 1.8 km || 
|-id=137 bgcolor=#fefefe
| 574137 ||  || — || February 14, 2010 || Mount Lemmon || Mount Lemmon Survey ||  || align=right data-sort-value="0.56" | 560 m || 
|-id=138 bgcolor=#E9E9E9
| 574138 ||  || — || October 25, 2008 || Mount Lemmon || Mount Lemmon Survey ||  || align=right | 2.1 km || 
|-id=139 bgcolor=#E9E9E9
| 574139 ||  || — || February 14, 2010 || Mount Lemmon || Mount Lemmon Survey ||  || align=right | 1.7 km || 
|-id=140 bgcolor=#E9E9E9
| 574140 ||  || — || February 14, 2010 || Mount Lemmon || Mount Lemmon Survey ||  || align=right | 1.5 km || 
|-id=141 bgcolor=#E9E9E9
| 574141 ||  || — || September 7, 2008 || Mount Lemmon || Mount Lemmon Survey ||  || align=right | 1.9 km || 
|-id=142 bgcolor=#fefefe
| 574142 ||  || — || February 14, 2010 || Kitt Peak || Spacewatch ||  || align=right data-sort-value="0.67" | 670 m || 
|-id=143 bgcolor=#FA8072
| 574143 ||  || — || February 7, 2006 || Kitt Peak || Spacewatch ||  || align=right data-sort-value="0.75" | 750 m || 
|-id=144 bgcolor=#d6d6d6
| 574144 ||  || — || October 22, 2003 || Anderson Mesa || LONEOS ||  || align=right | 3.5 km || 
|-id=145 bgcolor=#E9E9E9
| 574145 ||  || — || September 10, 2007 || Mount Lemmon || Mount Lemmon Survey ||  || align=right | 2.3 km || 
|-id=146 bgcolor=#E9E9E9
| 574146 ||  || — || February 15, 2010 || Mount Lemmon || Mount Lemmon Survey ||  || align=right | 1.5 km || 
|-id=147 bgcolor=#fefefe
| 574147 ||  || — || February 15, 2010 || Kitt Peak || Spacewatch ||  || align=right data-sort-value="0.78" | 780 m || 
|-id=148 bgcolor=#E9E9E9
| 574148 ||  || — || November 16, 2009 || Mount Lemmon || Mount Lemmon Survey ||  || align=right | 2.2 km || 
|-id=149 bgcolor=#d6d6d6
| 574149 ||  || — || May 24, 2006 || Mount Lemmon || Mount Lemmon Survey ||  || align=right | 2.1 km || 
|-id=150 bgcolor=#fefefe
| 574150 ||  || — || February 13, 2010 || Mount Lemmon || Mount Lemmon Survey ||  || align=right data-sort-value="0.58" | 580 m || 
|-id=151 bgcolor=#E9E9E9
| 574151 ||  || — || December 20, 2009 || Mount Lemmon || Mount Lemmon Survey ||  || align=right | 2.2 km || 
|-id=152 bgcolor=#E9E9E9
| 574152 ||  || — || December 2, 2005 || Mauna Kea || Mauna Kea Obs. ||  || align=right | 2.2 km || 
|-id=153 bgcolor=#fefefe
| 574153 ||  || — || April 26, 2007 || Mount Lemmon || Mount Lemmon Survey ||  || align=right data-sort-value="0.58" | 580 m || 
|-id=154 bgcolor=#fefefe
| 574154 ||  || — || February 15, 2010 || Kitt Peak || Spacewatch || H || align=right data-sort-value="0.60" | 600 m || 
|-id=155 bgcolor=#fefefe
| 574155 ||  || — || April 19, 2007 || Mount Lemmon || Mount Lemmon Survey ||  || align=right data-sort-value="0.65" | 650 m || 
|-id=156 bgcolor=#fefefe
| 574156 ||  || — || August 28, 2003 || Palomar || NEAT || H || align=right data-sort-value="0.46" | 460 m || 
|-id=157 bgcolor=#E9E9E9
| 574157 ||  || — || February 13, 2010 || Catalina || CSS ||  || align=right | 2.6 km || 
|-id=158 bgcolor=#E9E9E9
| 574158 ||  || — || February 9, 2010 || Kitt Peak || Spacewatch ||  || align=right | 2.3 km || 
|-id=159 bgcolor=#fefefe
| 574159 ||  || — || May 5, 2003 || Kitt Peak || Spacewatch ||  || align=right data-sort-value="0.82" | 820 m || 
|-id=160 bgcolor=#fefefe
| 574160 ||  || — || February 15, 2010 || Kitt Peak || Spacewatch ||  || align=right data-sort-value="0.78" | 780 m || 
|-id=161 bgcolor=#fefefe
| 574161 ||  || — || February 5, 2010 || Kitt Peak || Spacewatch || H || align=right data-sort-value="0.51" | 510 m || 
|-id=162 bgcolor=#E9E9E9
| 574162 ||  || — || February 6, 2010 || Mount Lemmon || Mount Lemmon Survey ||  || align=right | 1.7 km || 
|-id=163 bgcolor=#E9E9E9
| 574163 ||  || — || January 7, 2010 || Kitt Peak || Spacewatch ||  || align=right | 1.2 km || 
|-id=164 bgcolor=#E9E9E9
| 574164 ||  || — || February 9, 2010 || Kitt Peak || Spacewatch ||  || align=right | 1.6 km || 
|-id=165 bgcolor=#E9E9E9
| 574165 ||  || — || March 13, 2005 || Mount Lemmon || Mount Lemmon Survey ||  || align=right | 2.0 km || 
|-id=166 bgcolor=#fefefe
| 574166 ||  || — || February 10, 2010 || Kitt Peak || Spacewatch ||  || align=right data-sort-value="0.81" | 810 m || 
|-id=167 bgcolor=#E9E9E9
| 574167 ||  || — || October 30, 2008 || Kitt Peak || Spacewatch ||  || align=right | 2.0 km || 
|-id=168 bgcolor=#E9E9E9
| 574168 ||  || — || February 15, 2010 || Catalina || CSS ||  || align=right | 2.1 km || 
|-id=169 bgcolor=#fefefe
| 574169 ||  || — || November 21, 2009 || Mount Lemmon || Mount Lemmon Survey ||  || align=right data-sort-value="0.77" | 770 m || 
|-id=170 bgcolor=#E9E9E9
| 574170 ||  || — || February 17, 2010 || Kitt Peak || Spacewatch || HNS || align=right | 1.3 km || 
|-id=171 bgcolor=#E9E9E9
| 574171 ||  || — || October 7, 2008 || Mount Lemmon || Mount Lemmon Survey ||  || align=right | 2.3 km || 
|-id=172 bgcolor=#d6d6d6
| 574172 ||  || — || December 2, 2010 || Kitt Peak || Spacewatch ||  || align=right | 2.4 km || 
|-id=173 bgcolor=#E9E9E9
| 574173 ||  || — || February 16, 2015 || Haleakala || Pan-STARRS ||  || align=right data-sort-value="0.84" | 840 m || 
|-id=174 bgcolor=#E9E9E9
| 574174 ||  || — || October 1, 2017 || Haleakala || Pan-STARRS ||  || align=right | 1.7 km || 
|-id=175 bgcolor=#E9E9E9
| 574175 ||  || — || January 7, 2010 || Catalina || CSS ||  || align=right | 1.4 km || 
|-id=176 bgcolor=#E9E9E9
| 574176 ||  || — || September 23, 2017 || Haleakala || Pan-STARRS ||  || align=right | 1.8 km || 
|-id=177 bgcolor=#d6d6d6
| 574177 ||  || — || February 13, 2010 || Mount Lemmon || Mount Lemmon Survey ||  || align=right | 1.9 km || 
|-id=178 bgcolor=#fefefe
| 574178 ||  || — || February 16, 2010 || Catalina || CSS || H || align=right data-sort-value="0.72" | 720 m || 
|-id=179 bgcolor=#E9E9E9
| 574179 ||  || — || February 16, 2010 || Mount Lemmon || Mount Lemmon Survey ||  || align=right | 1.6 km || 
|-id=180 bgcolor=#E9E9E9
| 574180 ||  || — || September 22, 2008 || Kitt Peak || Spacewatch ||  || align=right | 2.4 km || 
|-id=181 bgcolor=#E9E9E9
| 574181 ||  || — || January 13, 2005 || Catalina || CSS ||  || align=right | 2.8 km || 
|-id=182 bgcolor=#d6d6d6
| 574182 ||  || — || February 11, 2000 || Kitt Peak || Spacewatch ||  || align=right | 2.3 km || 
|-id=183 bgcolor=#E9E9E9
| 574183 ||  || — || October 31, 2008 || Mount Lemmon || Mount Lemmon Survey ||  || align=right | 1.9 km || 
|-id=184 bgcolor=#fefefe
| 574184 ||  || — || February 16, 2010 || Kitt Peak || Spacewatch ||  || align=right data-sort-value="0.53" | 530 m || 
|-id=185 bgcolor=#E9E9E9
| 574185 ||  || — || November 9, 2008 || Kitt Peak || Spacewatch ||  || align=right | 2.1 km || 
|-id=186 bgcolor=#fefefe
| 574186 ||  || — || March 15, 2007 || Kitt Peak || Spacewatch ||  || align=right data-sort-value="0.63" | 630 m || 
|-id=187 bgcolor=#fefefe
| 574187 ||  || — || February 22, 2003 || Palomar || NEAT ||  || align=right | 1.1 km || 
|-id=188 bgcolor=#fefefe
| 574188 ||  || — || December 19, 2009 || Kitt Peak || Spacewatch ||  || align=right data-sort-value="0.73" | 730 m || 
|-id=189 bgcolor=#E9E9E9
| 574189 ||  || — || February 17, 2015 || Haleakala || Pan-STARRS ||  || align=right | 1.8 km || 
|-id=190 bgcolor=#E9E9E9
| 574190 ||  || — || October 6, 2012 || Haleakala || Pan-STARRS ||  || align=right | 2.3 km || 
|-id=191 bgcolor=#E9E9E9
| 574191 ||  || — || December 18, 2009 || Mount Lemmon || Mount Lemmon Survey ||  || align=right | 1.4 km || 
|-id=192 bgcolor=#d6d6d6
| 574192 ||  || — || February 17, 2010 || Kitt Peak || Spacewatch ||  || align=right | 2.0 km || 
|-id=193 bgcolor=#E9E9E9
| 574193 ||  || — || February 19, 2015 || Haleakala || Pan-STARRS ||  || align=right | 1.5 km || 
|-id=194 bgcolor=#E9E9E9
| 574194 ||  || — || February 16, 2010 || Mount Lemmon || Mount Lemmon Survey ||  || align=right | 1.3 km || 
|-id=195 bgcolor=#E9E9E9
| 574195 ||  || — || August 19, 2012 || Siding Spring || SSS ||  || align=right | 2.4 km || 
|-id=196 bgcolor=#fefefe
| 574196 ||  || — || February 18, 2010 || Kitt Peak || Spacewatch ||  || align=right data-sort-value="0.54" | 540 m || 
|-id=197 bgcolor=#E9E9E9
| 574197 ||  || — || September 30, 2017 || Mount Lemmon || Mount Lemmon Survey ||  || align=right | 1.4 km || 
|-id=198 bgcolor=#E9E9E9
| 574198 ||  || — || February 16, 2010 || Kitt Peak || Spacewatch ||  || align=right | 1.4 km || 
|-id=199 bgcolor=#fefefe
| 574199 ||  || — || February 17, 2010 || Mount Lemmon || Mount Lemmon Survey ||  || align=right data-sort-value="0.51" | 510 m || 
|-id=200 bgcolor=#d6d6d6
| 574200 ||  || — || February 17, 2010 || Kitt Peak || Spacewatch ||  || align=right | 1.7 km || 
|}

574201–574300 

|-bgcolor=#fefefe
| 574201 ||  || — || March 4, 2010 || Taunus || S. Karge, E. Schwab ||  || align=right data-sort-value="0.75" | 750 m || 
|-id=202 bgcolor=#E9E9E9
| 574202 ||  || — || September 30, 2003 || Kitt Peak || Spacewatch ||  || align=right | 2.3 km || 
|-id=203 bgcolor=#E9E9E9
| 574203 ||  || — || December 11, 2004 || Socorro || LINEAR ||  || align=right | 2.5 km || 
|-id=204 bgcolor=#FA8072
| 574204 ||  || — || April 9, 2003 || Kitt Peak || Spacewatch ||  || align=right data-sort-value="0.68" | 680 m || 
|-id=205 bgcolor=#E9E9E9
| 574205 ||  || — || October 22, 2003 || Kitt Peak || Spacewatch || AGN || align=right | 1.5 km || 
|-id=206 bgcolor=#fefefe
| 574206 ||  || — || March 12, 2010 || Mount Lemmon || Mount Lemmon Survey ||  || align=right data-sort-value="0.66" | 660 m || 
|-id=207 bgcolor=#E9E9E9
| 574207 ||  || — || March 13, 2010 || Mount Lemmon || Mount Lemmon Survey ||  || align=right | 1.7 km || 
|-id=208 bgcolor=#d6d6d6
| 574208 ||  || — || March 4, 2005 || Mount Lemmon || Mount Lemmon Survey ||  || align=right | 2.3 km || 
|-id=209 bgcolor=#fefefe
| 574209 ||  || — || February 21, 2003 || Palomar || NEAT ||  || align=right data-sort-value="0.72" | 720 m || 
|-id=210 bgcolor=#d6d6d6
| 574210 ||  || — || February 16, 2010 || Kitt Peak || Spacewatch ||  || align=right | 1.9 km || 
|-id=211 bgcolor=#d6d6d6
| 574211 ||  || — || March 12, 2010 || Mount Lemmon || Mount Lemmon Survey ||  || align=right | 1.8 km || 
|-id=212 bgcolor=#E9E9E9
| 574212 ||  || — || March 12, 2010 || Mount Lemmon || Mount Lemmon Survey ||  || align=right | 1.7 km || 
|-id=213 bgcolor=#fefefe
| 574213 ||  || — || March 12, 2010 || Mount Lemmon || Mount Lemmon Survey ||  || align=right data-sort-value="0.60" | 600 m || 
|-id=214 bgcolor=#fefefe
| 574214 ||  || — || February 19, 2010 || Mount Lemmon || Mount Lemmon Survey ||  || align=right data-sort-value="0.66" | 660 m || 
|-id=215 bgcolor=#E9E9E9
| 574215 ||  || — || October 24, 2003 || Kitt Peak || Spacewatch ||  || align=right | 2.5 km || 
|-id=216 bgcolor=#E9E9E9
| 574216 ||  || — || April 26, 2001 || La Silla ||  ||  || align=right | 1.9 km || 
|-id=217 bgcolor=#fefefe
| 574217 ||  || — || March 13, 2010 || Kitt Peak || Spacewatch ||  || align=right data-sort-value="0.74" | 740 m || 
|-id=218 bgcolor=#fefefe
| 574218 ||  || — || August 23, 2004 || Kitt Peak || Spacewatch ||  || align=right data-sort-value="0.72" | 720 m || 
|-id=219 bgcolor=#E9E9E9
| 574219 ||  || — || March 11, 2005 || Mount Lemmon || Mount Lemmon Survey ||  || align=right | 2.2 km || 
|-id=220 bgcolor=#E9E9E9
| 574220 ||  || — || September 16, 2003 || Kitt Peak || Spacewatch ||  || align=right | 3.9 km || 
|-id=221 bgcolor=#fefefe
| 574221 ||  || — || February 18, 2010 || Mount Lemmon || Mount Lemmon Survey ||  || align=right data-sort-value="0.49" | 490 m || 
|-id=222 bgcolor=#fefefe
| 574222 ||  || — || March 15, 2010 || Mount Lemmon || Mount Lemmon Survey ||  || align=right data-sort-value="0.51" | 510 m || 
|-id=223 bgcolor=#fefefe
| 574223 ||  || — || March 24, 2003 || Kitt Peak || Spacewatch ||  || align=right data-sort-value="0.62" | 620 m || 
|-id=224 bgcolor=#d6d6d6
| 574224 ||  || — || October 13, 2007 || Kitt Peak || Spacewatch ||  || align=right | 2.8 km || 
|-id=225 bgcolor=#fefefe
| 574225 ||  || — || March 13, 2010 || Kitt Peak || Spacewatch ||  || align=right data-sort-value="0.57" | 570 m || 
|-id=226 bgcolor=#E9E9E9
| 574226 ||  || — || March 13, 2010 || Mount Lemmon || Mount Lemmon Survey ||  || align=right | 1.6 km || 
|-id=227 bgcolor=#E9E9E9
| 574227 ||  || — || February 18, 2010 || Mount Lemmon || Mount Lemmon Survey ||  || align=right | 1.3 km || 
|-id=228 bgcolor=#fefefe
| 574228 ||  || — || March 15, 2010 || Kitt Peak || Spacewatch ||  || align=right data-sort-value="0.62" | 620 m || 
|-id=229 bgcolor=#fefefe
| 574229 ||  || — || November 26, 2005 || Mount Lemmon || Mount Lemmon Survey ||  || align=right data-sort-value="0.49" | 490 m || 
|-id=230 bgcolor=#E9E9E9
| 574230 ||  || — || February 20, 2006 || Kitt Peak || Spacewatch ||  || align=right | 1.6 km || 
|-id=231 bgcolor=#fefefe
| 574231 ||  || — || March 13, 2010 || Mount Lemmon || Mount Lemmon Survey ||  || align=right data-sort-value="0.58" | 580 m || 
|-id=232 bgcolor=#fefefe
| 574232 ||  || — || March 13, 2010 || Mount Lemmon || Mount Lemmon Survey ||  || align=right data-sort-value="0.64" | 640 m || 
|-id=233 bgcolor=#fefefe
| 574233 ||  || — || March 16, 2010 || Mount Lemmon || Mount Lemmon Survey ||  || align=right data-sort-value="0.83" | 830 m || 
|-id=234 bgcolor=#E9E9E9
| 574234 ||  || — || September 16, 2003 || Kitt Peak || Spacewatch ||  || align=right | 2.3 km || 
|-id=235 bgcolor=#d6d6d6
| 574235 ||  || — || November 30, 2008 || Kitt Peak || Spacewatch ||  || align=right | 2.3 km || 
|-id=236 bgcolor=#fefefe
| 574236 ||  || — || March 17, 2010 || Kitt Peak || Spacewatch ||  || align=right data-sort-value="0.56" | 560 m || 
|-id=237 bgcolor=#fefefe
| 574237 ||  || — || March 17, 2010 || Kitt Peak || Spacewatch ||  || align=right data-sort-value="0.62" | 620 m || 
|-id=238 bgcolor=#E9E9E9
| 574238 ||  || — || October 15, 2004 || Mount Lemmon || Mount Lemmon Survey ||  || align=right | 1.9 km || 
|-id=239 bgcolor=#d6d6d6
| 574239 ||  || — || August 29, 2002 || Kitt Peak || Spacewatch ||  || align=right | 2.0 km || 
|-id=240 bgcolor=#d6d6d6
| 574240 ||  || — || March 18, 2010 || Kitt Peak || Spacewatch ||  || align=right | 1.9 km || 
|-id=241 bgcolor=#d6d6d6
| 574241 ||  || — || February 18, 2010 || Kitt Peak || Spacewatch ||  || align=right | 2.7 km || 
|-id=242 bgcolor=#d6d6d6
| 574242 ||  || — || March 19, 2010 || Mount Lemmon || Mount Lemmon Survey ||  || align=right | 1.9 km || 
|-id=243 bgcolor=#E9E9E9
| 574243 ||  || — || March 16, 2010 || Kitt Peak || Spacewatch ||  || align=right | 1.3 km || 
|-id=244 bgcolor=#E9E9E9
| 574244 ||  || — || September 13, 2007 || Mount Lemmon || Mount Lemmon Survey ||  || align=right | 1.9 km || 
|-id=245 bgcolor=#E9E9E9
| 574245 ||  || — || March 21, 2010 || Kitt Peak || Spacewatch ||  || align=right | 1.5 km || 
|-id=246 bgcolor=#fefefe
| 574246 ||  || — || March 18, 2010 || Mount Lemmon || Mount Lemmon Survey ||  || align=right data-sort-value="0.68" | 680 m || 
|-id=247 bgcolor=#fefefe
| 574247 ||  || — || March 18, 2010 || Mount Lemmon || Mount Lemmon Survey ||  || align=right data-sort-value="0.75" | 750 m || 
|-id=248 bgcolor=#E9E9E9
| 574248 ||  || — || March 18, 2010 || Mount Lemmon || Mount Lemmon Survey ||  || align=right | 1.8 km || 
|-id=249 bgcolor=#d6d6d6
| 574249 ||  || — || March 21, 2010 || Kitt Peak || Spacewatch ||  || align=right | 2.9 km || 
|-id=250 bgcolor=#E9E9E9
| 574250 ||  || — || March 20, 2010 || Kitt Peak || Spacewatch ||  || align=right | 2.2 km || 
|-id=251 bgcolor=#fefefe
| 574251 ||  || — || February 17, 2010 || Mount Lemmon || Mount Lemmon Survey ||  || align=right data-sort-value="0.57" | 570 m || 
|-id=252 bgcolor=#E9E9E9
| 574252 ||  || — || February 23, 2015 || Haleakala || Pan-STARRS ||  || align=right | 1.3 km || 
|-id=253 bgcolor=#d6d6d6
| 574253 ||  || — || December 4, 2013 || Haleakala || Pan-STARRS ||  || align=right | 2.0 km || 
|-id=254 bgcolor=#fefefe
| 574254 ||  || — || March 16, 2010 || Mount Lemmon || Mount Lemmon Survey ||  || align=right data-sort-value="0.76" | 760 m || 
|-id=255 bgcolor=#fefefe
| 574255 ||  || — || March 18, 2010 || Kitt Peak || Spacewatch ||  || align=right data-sort-value="0.56" | 560 m || 
|-id=256 bgcolor=#fefefe
| 574256 ||  || — || March 18, 2010 || Kitt Peak || Spacewatch ||  || align=right data-sort-value="0.65" | 650 m || 
|-id=257 bgcolor=#fefefe
| 574257 ||  || — || June 29, 2014 || Haleakala || Pan-STARRS ||  || align=right data-sort-value="0.55" | 550 m || 
|-id=258 bgcolor=#E9E9E9
| 574258 ||  || — || July 30, 2017 || Haleakala || Pan-STARRS ||  || align=right | 2.0 km || 
|-id=259 bgcolor=#d6d6d6
| 574259 ||  || — || March 18, 2010 || Mount Lemmon || Mount Lemmon Survey ||  || align=right | 2.1 km || 
|-id=260 bgcolor=#d6d6d6
| 574260 ||  || — || March 21, 2010 || Kitt Peak || Spacewatch ||  || align=right | 2.7 km || 
|-id=261 bgcolor=#E9E9E9
| 574261 ||  || — || March 18, 2010 || Kitt Peak || Spacewatch ||  || align=right | 1.8 km || 
|-id=262 bgcolor=#d6d6d6
| 574262 ||  || — || March 18, 2010 || Mount Lemmon || Mount Lemmon Survey ||  || align=right | 2.4 km || 
|-id=263 bgcolor=#d6d6d6
| 574263 ||  || — || March 20, 2010 || Mount Lemmon || Mount Lemmon Survey || 3:2 || align=right | 4.1 km || 
|-id=264 bgcolor=#fefefe
| 574264 ||  || — || March 12, 2010 || Kitt Peak || Spacewatch ||  || align=right data-sort-value="0.66" | 660 m || 
|-id=265 bgcolor=#fefefe
| 574265 ||  || — || April 10, 2010 || Mount Lemmon || Mount Lemmon Survey ||  || align=right data-sort-value="0.53" | 530 m || 
|-id=266 bgcolor=#E9E9E9
| 574266 ||  || — || January 26, 2001 || Kitt Peak || Spacewatch ||  || align=right | 1.6 km || 
|-id=267 bgcolor=#fefefe
| 574267 ||  || — || November 26, 2005 || Kitt Peak || Spacewatch ||  || align=right data-sort-value="0.69" | 690 m || 
|-id=268 bgcolor=#d6d6d6
| 574268 ||  || — || August 5, 2005 || Palomar || NEAT ||  || align=right | 3.0 km || 
|-id=269 bgcolor=#C2FFFF
| 574269 ||  || — || January 12, 2018 || Haleakala || Pan-STARRS || L5 || align=right | 7.8 km || 
|-id=270 bgcolor=#d6d6d6
| 574270 ||  || — || February 16, 2005 || La Silla || A. Boattini ||  || align=right | 2.4 km || 
|-id=271 bgcolor=#fefefe
| 574271 ||  || — || April 6, 2010 || Mount Lemmon || Mount Lemmon Survey ||  || align=right data-sort-value="0.67" | 670 m || 
|-id=272 bgcolor=#fefefe
| 574272 ||  || — || April 6, 2010 || Kitt Peak || Spacewatch ||  || align=right data-sort-value="0.79" | 790 m || 
|-id=273 bgcolor=#d6d6d6
| 574273 ||  || — || April 8, 2010 || Kitt Peak || Spacewatch ||  || align=right | 2.5 km || 
|-id=274 bgcolor=#E9E9E9
| 574274 ||  || — || April 8, 2010 || Kitt Peak || Spacewatch ||  || align=right | 2.0 km || 
|-id=275 bgcolor=#fefefe
| 574275 ||  || — || September 5, 2007 || Catalina || CSS ||  || align=right data-sort-value="0.76" | 760 m || 
|-id=276 bgcolor=#d6d6d6
| 574276 ||  || — || June 11, 2005 || Kitt Peak || Spacewatch ||  || align=right | 3.1 km || 
|-id=277 bgcolor=#fefefe
| 574277 ||  || — || April 4, 2010 || Kitt Peak || Spacewatch ||  || align=right data-sort-value="0.47" | 470 m || 
|-id=278 bgcolor=#fefefe
| 574278 ||  || — || April 8, 2010 || Kitt Peak || Spacewatch ||  || align=right data-sort-value="0.80" | 800 m || 
|-id=279 bgcolor=#d6d6d6
| 574279 ||  || — || October 10, 2007 || Kitt Peak || Spacewatch ||  || align=right | 2.1 km || 
|-id=280 bgcolor=#E9E9E9
| 574280 ||  || — || October 18, 2007 || Kitt Peak || Spacewatch ||  || align=right | 2.2 km || 
|-id=281 bgcolor=#d6d6d6
| 574281 ||  || — || January 30, 2004 || Kitt Peak || Spacewatch ||  || align=right | 2.6 km || 
|-id=282 bgcolor=#fefefe
| 574282 ||  || — || April 4, 2010 || Kitt Peak || Spacewatch ||  || align=right data-sort-value="0.77" | 770 m || 
|-id=283 bgcolor=#d6d6d6
| 574283 ||  || — || October 12, 2007 || Mount Lemmon || Mount Lemmon Survey ||  || align=right | 3.0 km || 
|-id=284 bgcolor=#E9E9E9
| 574284 ||  || — || October 21, 2007 || Mount Lemmon || Mount Lemmon Survey ||  || align=right | 2.2 km || 
|-id=285 bgcolor=#fefefe
| 574285 ||  || — || April 8, 2010 || Kitt Peak || Spacewatch ||  || align=right data-sort-value="0.64" | 640 m || 
|-id=286 bgcolor=#fefefe
| 574286 ||  || — || March 24, 2003 || Kitt Peak || Spacewatch ||  || align=right data-sort-value="0.66" | 660 m || 
|-id=287 bgcolor=#fefefe
| 574287 ||  || — || April 14, 2010 || Mount Lemmon || Mount Lemmon Survey ||  || align=right data-sort-value="0.54" | 540 m || 
|-id=288 bgcolor=#fefefe
| 574288 ||  || — || June 9, 2014 || Mount Lemmon || Mount Lemmon Survey ||  || align=right data-sort-value="0.94" | 940 m || 
|-id=289 bgcolor=#d6d6d6
| 574289 ||  || — || December 23, 2012 || Haleakala || Pan-STARRS ||  || align=right | 2.6 km || 
|-id=290 bgcolor=#E9E9E9
| 574290 ||  || — || March 4, 2006 || Kitt Peak || Spacewatch ||  || align=right | 1.5 km || 
|-id=291 bgcolor=#E9E9E9
| 574291 ||  || — || September 23, 2008 || Kitt Peak || Spacewatch ||  || align=right | 1.9 km || 
|-id=292 bgcolor=#fefefe
| 574292 ||  || — || February 8, 2013 || Haleakala || Pan-STARRS ||  || align=right data-sort-value="0.69" | 690 m || 
|-id=293 bgcolor=#fefefe
| 574293 ||  || — || October 9, 2015 || Haleakala || Pan-STARRS ||  || align=right data-sort-value="0.75" | 750 m || 
|-id=294 bgcolor=#fefefe
| 574294 ||  || — || April 14, 2010 || Mount Lemmon || Mount Lemmon Survey || H || align=right data-sort-value="0.52" | 520 m || 
|-id=295 bgcolor=#d6d6d6
| 574295 ||  || — || February 23, 2015 || Haleakala || Pan-STARRS ||  || align=right | 1.8 km || 
|-id=296 bgcolor=#fefefe
| 574296 ||  || — || April 14, 2010 || Mount Lemmon || Mount Lemmon Survey ||  || align=right data-sort-value="0.51" | 510 m || 
|-id=297 bgcolor=#d6d6d6
| 574297 ||  || — || October 11, 2012 || Mount Lemmon || Mount Lemmon Survey ||  || align=right | 2.1 km || 
|-id=298 bgcolor=#fefefe
| 574298 ||  || — || July 3, 2014 || Haleakala || Pan-STARRS ||  || align=right data-sort-value="0.67" | 670 m || 
|-id=299 bgcolor=#fefefe
| 574299 ||  || — || April 15, 2010 || Mount Lemmon || Mount Lemmon Survey || H || align=right data-sort-value="0.43" | 430 m || 
|-id=300 bgcolor=#fefefe
| 574300 Curelaru ||  ||  || July 10, 2014 || La Palma || O. Vaduvescu, O. Zamora ||  || align=right data-sort-value="0.60" | 600 m || 
|}

574301–574400 

|-bgcolor=#fefefe
| 574301 ||  || — || December 12, 2015 || Haleakala || Pan-STARRS ||  || align=right data-sort-value="0.61" | 610 m || 
|-id=302 bgcolor=#E9E9E9
| 574302 ||  || — || April 12, 2010 || Mount Lemmon || Mount Lemmon Survey ||  || align=right | 1.3 km || 
|-id=303 bgcolor=#fefefe
| 574303 ||  || — || April 10, 2010 || Kitt Peak || Spacewatch ||  || align=right data-sort-value="0.62" | 620 m || 
|-id=304 bgcolor=#fefefe
| 574304 ||  || — || April 10, 2010 || Mount Lemmon || Mount Lemmon Survey ||  || align=right data-sort-value="0.61" | 610 m || 
|-id=305 bgcolor=#d6d6d6
| 574305 ||  || — || April 9, 2010 || Mount Lemmon || Mount Lemmon Survey ||  || align=right | 1.8 km || 
|-id=306 bgcolor=#E9E9E9
| 574306 ||  || — || April 10, 2010 || Mount Lemmon || Mount Lemmon Survey ||  || align=right | 1.6 km || 
|-id=307 bgcolor=#d6d6d6
| 574307 ||  || — || April 16, 2010 || WISE || WISE ||  || align=right | 2.5 km || 
|-id=308 bgcolor=#d6d6d6
| 574308 ||  || — || December 1, 2006 || Mount Lemmon || Mount Lemmon Survey ||  || align=right | 3.4 km || 
|-id=309 bgcolor=#d6d6d6
| 574309 ||  || — || July 29, 2000 || Cerro Tololo || M. W. Buie, S. D. Kern ||  || align=right | 2.3 km || 
|-id=310 bgcolor=#d6d6d6
| 574310 ||  || — || May 8, 2005 || Mount Lemmon || Mount Lemmon Survey ||  || align=right | 2.4 km || 
|-id=311 bgcolor=#fefefe
| 574311 ||  || — || November 7, 2008 || Mount Lemmon || Mount Lemmon Survey ||  || align=right data-sort-value="0.63" | 630 m || 
|-id=312 bgcolor=#E9E9E9
| 574312 ||  || — || December 23, 2017 || Haleakala || Pan-STARRS ||  || align=right data-sort-value="0.86" | 860 m || 
|-id=313 bgcolor=#d6d6d6
| 574313 ||  || — || April 25, 2015 || Haleakala || Pan-STARRS ||  || align=right | 2.4 km || 
|-id=314 bgcolor=#d6d6d6
| 574314 ||  || — || July 7, 2016 || Mount Lemmon || Mount Lemmon Survey ||  || align=right | 2.6 km || 
|-id=315 bgcolor=#d6d6d6
| 574315 ||  || — || April 1, 2009 || Kitt Peak || Spacewatch ||  || align=right | 2.1 km || 
|-id=316 bgcolor=#d6d6d6
| 574316 ||  || — || July 14, 2016 || Haleakala || Pan-STARRS ||  || align=right | 2.5 km || 
|-id=317 bgcolor=#E9E9E9
| 574317 ||  || — || September 24, 1995 || Kitt Peak || Spacewatch ||  || align=right | 1.5 km || 
|-id=318 bgcolor=#d6d6d6
| 574318 ||  || — || May 14, 2009 || Kitt Peak || Spacewatch ||  || align=right | 3.0 km || 
|-id=319 bgcolor=#E9E9E9
| 574319 ||  || — || May 6, 2011 || Mount Lemmon || Mount Lemmon Survey ||  || align=right | 2.2 km || 
|-id=320 bgcolor=#E9E9E9
| 574320 ||  || — || November 1, 2007 || Kitt Peak || Spacewatch ||  || align=right | 1.5 km || 
|-id=321 bgcolor=#E9E9E9
| 574321 ||  || — || April 20, 2010 || Mount Lemmon || Mount Lemmon Survey ||  || align=right | 1.7 km || 
|-id=322 bgcolor=#d6d6d6
| 574322 ||  || — || March 29, 2015 || Haleakala || Pan-STARRS ||  || align=right | 1.9 km || 
|-id=323 bgcolor=#d6d6d6
| 574323 ||  || — || February 17, 2015 || Haleakala || Pan-STARRS ||  || align=right | 2.8 km || 
|-id=324 bgcolor=#FA8072
| 574324 ||  || — || May 4, 2010 || Nogales || M. Schwartz, P. R. Holvorcem ||  || align=right | 1.1 km || 
|-id=325 bgcolor=#E9E9E9
| 574325 ||  || — || May 3, 2010 || Kitt Peak || Spacewatch ||  || align=right | 2.0 km || 
|-id=326 bgcolor=#d6d6d6
| 574326 ||  || — || May 3, 2010 || Kitt Peak || Spacewatch ||  || align=right | 2.8 km || 
|-id=327 bgcolor=#d6d6d6
| 574327 ||  || — || October 30, 2007 || Kitt Peak || Spacewatch ||  || align=right | 1.9 km || 
|-id=328 bgcolor=#d6d6d6
| 574328 ||  || — || May 6, 2010 || Mount Lemmon || Mount Lemmon Survey ||  || align=right | 3.1 km || 
|-id=329 bgcolor=#d6d6d6
| 574329 ||  || — || August 21, 2001 || Cerro Tololo || Cerro Tololo Obs. ||  || align=right | 1.9 km || 
|-id=330 bgcolor=#fefefe
| 574330 ||  || — || May 5, 2010 || Mount Lemmon || Mount Lemmon Survey ||  || align=right data-sort-value="0.58" | 580 m || 
|-id=331 bgcolor=#d6d6d6
| 574331 ||  || — || May 6, 2010 || Mount Lemmon || Mount Lemmon Survey ||  || align=right | 1.8 km || 
|-id=332 bgcolor=#d6d6d6
| 574332 ||  || — || December 29, 2008 || Bergisch Gladbach || W. Bickel ||  || align=right | 2.8 km || 
|-id=333 bgcolor=#d6d6d6
| 574333 ||  || — || May 7, 2010 || Kitt Peak || Spacewatch ||  || align=right | 3.0 km || 
|-id=334 bgcolor=#d6d6d6
| 574334 ||  || — || May 7, 2010 || Kitt Peak || Spacewatch ||  || align=right | 2.0 km || 
|-id=335 bgcolor=#E9E9E9
| 574335 ||  || — || May 7, 2010 || Kitt Peak || Spacewatch ||  || align=right | 1.4 km || 
|-id=336 bgcolor=#fefefe
| 574336 ||  || — || May 8, 2010 || LightBuckets || T. Vorobjov ||  || align=right data-sort-value="0.81" | 810 m || 
|-id=337 bgcolor=#E9E9E9
| 574337 ||  || — || April 12, 2010 || Mount Lemmon || Mount Lemmon Survey ||  || align=right | 1.3 km || 
|-id=338 bgcolor=#fefefe
| 574338 ||  || — || May 9, 2010 || Mount Lemmon || Mount Lemmon Survey ||  || align=right data-sort-value="0.61" | 610 m || 
|-id=339 bgcolor=#fefefe
| 574339 ||  || — || April 8, 2010 || Kitt Peak || Spacewatch ||  || align=right data-sort-value="0.61" | 610 m || 
|-id=340 bgcolor=#d6d6d6
| 574340 ||  || — || December 30, 2008 || Kitt Peak || Spacewatch ||  || align=right | 2.0 km || 
|-id=341 bgcolor=#fefefe
| 574341 ||  || — || May 11, 2010 || Mount Lemmon || Mount Lemmon Survey ||  || align=right data-sort-value="0.59" | 590 m || 
|-id=342 bgcolor=#d6d6d6
| 574342 ||  || — || September 16, 2006 || Kitt Peak || Spacewatch ||  || align=right | 2.2 km || 
|-id=343 bgcolor=#fefefe
| 574343 ||  || — || January 30, 2006 || Flagstaff || L. H. Wasserman ||  || align=right data-sort-value="0.75" | 750 m || 
|-id=344 bgcolor=#d6d6d6
| 574344 ||  || — || May 11, 2010 || Mount Lemmon || Mount Lemmon Survey ||  || align=right | 2.2 km || 
|-id=345 bgcolor=#fefefe
| 574345 ||  || — || May 29, 2003 || Kitt Peak || Spacewatch ||  || align=right data-sort-value="0.75" | 750 m || 
|-id=346 bgcolor=#d6d6d6
| 574346 ||  || — || May 12, 2010 || Kitt Peak || Spacewatch ||  || align=right | 2.2 km || 
|-id=347 bgcolor=#fefefe
| 574347 ||  || — || July 18, 2007 || Mount Lemmon || Mount Lemmon Survey ||  || align=right data-sort-value="0.63" | 630 m || 
|-id=348 bgcolor=#fefefe
| 574348 ||  || — || May 7, 2010 || Mount Lemmon || Mount Lemmon Survey ||  || align=right data-sort-value="0.78" | 780 m || 
|-id=349 bgcolor=#fefefe
| 574349 ||  || — || May 10, 2010 || Mount Lemmon || Mount Lemmon Survey || H || align=right data-sort-value="0.50" | 500 m || 
|-id=350 bgcolor=#d6d6d6
| 574350 ||  || — || May 7, 2005 || Mount Lemmon || Mount Lemmon Survey ||  || align=right | 2.2 km || 
|-id=351 bgcolor=#d6d6d6
| 574351 ||  || — || November 3, 2007 || Kitt Peak || Spacewatch ||  || align=right | 2.1 km || 
|-id=352 bgcolor=#d6d6d6
| 574352 ||  || — || March 19, 2010 || Mount Lemmon || Mount Lemmon Survey ||  || align=right | 2.4 km || 
|-id=353 bgcolor=#d6d6d6
| 574353 ||  || — || August 29, 2006 || Kitt Peak || Spacewatch ||  || align=right | 2.9 km || 
|-id=354 bgcolor=#fefefe
| 574354 ||  || — || May 12, 2010 || Mount Lemmon || Mount Lemmon Survey ||  || align=right data-sort-value="0.68" | 680 m || 
|-id=355 bgcolor=#fefefe
| 574355 ||  || — || May 13, 2010 || Kitt Peak || Spacewatch ||  || align=right data-sort-value="0.75" | 750 m || 
|-id=356 bgcolor=#fefefe
| 574356 ||  || — || April 9, 2010 || Kitt Peak || Spacewatch ||  || align=right data-sort-value="0.56" | 560 m || 
|-id=357 bgcolor=#d6d6d6
| 574357 ||  || — || May 11, 2010 || Mount Lemmon || Mount Lemmon Survey ||  || align=right | 2.7 km || 
|-id=358 bgcolor=#fefefe
| 574358 ||  || — || May 11, 2010 || Mount Lemmon || Mount Lemmon Survey ||  || align=right data-sort-value="0.75" | 750 m || 
|-id=359 bgcolor=#d6d6d6
| 574359 ||  || — || May 11, 2010 || Kitt Peak || Spacewatch ||  || align=right | 2.3 km || 
|-id=360 bgcolor=#d6d6d6
| 574360 ||  || — || May 12, 2010 || Mount Lemmon || Mount Lemmon Survey ||  || align=right | 2.8 km || 
|-id=361 bgcolor=#E9E9E9
| 574361 ||  || — || May 14, 2010 || Mount Lemmon || Mount Lemmon Survey ||  || align=right | 1.4 km || 
|-id=362 bgcolor=#d6d6d6
| 574362 ||  || — || May 5, 2010 || Mount Lemmon || Mount Lemmon Survey ||  || align=right | 2.4 km || 
|-id=363 bgcolor=#d6d6d6
| 574363 ||  || — || May 11, 2010 || Mount Lemmon || Mount Lemmon Survey ||  || align=right | 2.0 km || 
|-id=364 bgcolor=#E9E9E9
| 574364 ||  || — || September 19, 1998 || Apache Point || SDSS Collaboration ||  || align=right | 1.8 km || 
|-id=365 bgcolor=#d6d6d6
| 574365 ||  || — || December 4, 2007 || Mount Lemmon || Mount Lemmon Survey ||  || align=right | 2.8 km || 
|-id=366 bgcolor=#fefefe
| 574366 ||  || — || March 19, 2010 || Kitt Peak || Spacewatch ||  || align=right data-sort-value="0.60" | 600 m || 
|-id=367 bgcolor=#fefefe
| 574367 ||  || — || May 6, 2010 || Kitt Peak || Spacewatch ||  || align=right data-sort-value="0.63" | 630 m || 
|-id=368 bgcolor=#d6d6d6
| 574368 ||  || — || April 16, 2005 || Kitt Peak || Spacewatch ||  || align=right | 2.3 km || 
|-id=369 bgcolor=#fefefe
| 574369 ||  || — || May 9, 2010 || Mount Lemmon || Mount Lemmon Survey ||  || align=right data-sort-value="0.60" | 600 m || 
|-id=370 bgcolor=#d6d6d6
| 574370 ||  || — || May 12, 2010 || Mount Lemmon || Mount Lemmon Survey ||  || align=right | 2.7 km || 
|-id=371 bgcolor=#fefefe
| 574371 ||  || — || October 1, 2011 || Mount Lemmon || Mount Lemmon Survey ||  || align=right data-sort-value="0.90" | 900 m || 
|-id=372 bgcolor=#C2E0FF
| 574372 ||  || — || May 10, 2010 || Haleakala || Pan-STARRS || SDO || align=right | 725 km || 
|-id=373 bgcolor=#E9E9E9
| 574373 ||  || — || December 4, 2013 || Haleakala || Pan-STARRS ||  || align=right | 2.3 km || 
|-id=374 bgcolor=#d6d6d6
| 574374 ||  || — || August 5, 2010 || Socorro || LINEAR ||  || align=right | 2.6 km || 
|-id=375 bgcolor=#E9E9E9
| 574375 ||  || — || October 23, 2008 || Kitt Peak || Spacewatch ||  || align=right | 2.0 km || 
|-id=376 bgcolor=#d6d6d6
| 574376 ||  || — || September 29, 2005 || Kitt Peak || Spacewatch ||  || align=right | 2.2 km || 
|-id=377 bgcolor=#d6d6d6
| 574377 ||  || — || October 23, 2012 || Mount Lemmon || Mount Lemmon Survey ||  || align=right | 2.4 km || 
|-id=378 bgcolor=#fefefe
| 574378 ||  || — || December 17, 2012 || Nogales || M. Schwartz, P. R. Holvorcem ||  || align=right | 1.3 km || 
|-id=379 bgcolor=#fefefe
| 574379 ||  || — || January 14, 2015 || Haleakala || Pan-STARRS || H || align=right data-sort-value="0.53" | 530 m || 
|-id=380 bgcolor=#d6d6d6
| 574380 ||  || — || April 25, 2015 || Haleakala || Pan-STARRS ||  || align=right | 1.8 km || 
|-id=381 bgcolor=#d6d6d6
| 574381 ||  || — || November 22, 2006 || Kitt Peak || Spacewatch ||  || align=right | 3.3 km || 
|-id=382 bgcolor=#E9E9E9
| 574382 ||  || — || May 17, 2010 || Kitt Peak || Spacewatch ||  || align=right | 1.2 km || 
|-id=383 bgcolor=#d6d6d6
| 574383 ||  || — || May 17, 2010 || Kitt Peak || Spacewatch ||  || align=right | 2.2 km || 
|-id=384 bgcolor=#d6d6d6
| 574384 ||  || — || April 17, 2005 || Kitt Peak || Spacewatch ||  || align=right | 2.6 km || 
|-id=385 bgcolor=#d6d6d6
| 574385 ||  || — || September 17, 2006 || Kitt Peak || Spacewatch ||  || align=right | 2.3 km || 
|-id=386 bgcolor=#fefefe
| 574386 ||  || — || May 11, 2010 || Mount Lemmon || Mount Lemmon Survey ||  || align=right data-sort-value="0.80" | 800 m || 
|-id=387 bgcolor=#d6d6d6
| 574387 ||  || — || February 26, 2014 || Haleakala || Pan-STARRS ||  || align=right | 2.2 km || 
|-id=388 bgcolor=#d6d6d6
| 574388 ||  || — || October 9, 2016 || Haleakala || Pan-STARRS ||  || align=right | 2.7 km || 
|-id=389 bgcolor=#d6d6d6
| 574389 ||  || — || August 14, 2004 || Cerro Tololo || Cerro Tololo Obs. ||  || align=right | 2.5 km || 
|-id=390 bgcolor=#d6d6d6
| 574390 ||  || — || September 5, 2010 || Mount Lemmon || Mount Lemmon Survey ||  || align=right | 2.4 km || 
|-id=391 bgcolor=#d6d6d6
| 574391 ||  || — || October 23, 2001 || Palomar || NEAT ||  || align=right | 3.0 km || 
|-id=392 bgcolor=#fefefe
| 574392 ||  || — || May 18, 2010 || Siding Spring || SSS ||  || align=right data-sort-value="0.72" | 720 m || 
|-id=393 bgcolor=#d6d6d6
| 574393 ||  || — || May 17, 2010 || Mount Lemmon || Mount Lemmon Survey ||  || align=right | 2.1 km || 
|-id=394 bgcolor=#fefefe
| 574394 ||  || — || May 16, 2010 || Mount Lemmon || Mount Lemmon Survey ||  || align=right data-sort-value="0.69" | 690 m || 
|-id=395 bgcolor=#d6d6d6
| 574395 ||  || — || May 21, 2010 || Mount Lemmon || Mount Lemmon Survey ||  || align=right | 2.8 km || 
|-id=396 bgcolor=#d6d6d6
| 574396 ||  || — || May 16, 2010 || Kitt Peak || Spacewatch ||  || align=right | 2.7 km || 
|-id=397 bgcolor=#fefefe
| 574397 ||  || — || June 3, 2010 || Nogales || M. Schwartz, P. R. Holvorcem ||  || align=right data-sort-value="0.82" | 820 m || 
|-id=398 bgcolor=#C7FF8F
| 574398 ||  || — || May 20, 2010 || Mount Lemmon || Mount Lemmon Survey || centaurcritical || align=right | 86 km || 
|-id=399 bgcolor=#fefefe
| 574399 ||  || — || May 29, 2003 || Apache Point || SDSS Collaboration ||  || align=right | 1.0 km || 
|-id=400 bgcolor=#E9E9E9
| 574400 ||  || — || October 20, 2006 || Mount Lemmon || Mount Lemmon Survey ||  || align=right | 2.0 km || 
|}

574401–574500 

|-bgcolor=#fefefe
| 574401 ||  || — || May 6, 2010 || Kitt Peak || Spacewatch ||  || align=right data-sort-value="0.76" | 760 m || 
|-id=402 bgcolor=#d6d6d6
| 574402 ||  || — || July 6, 2005 || Siding Spring || SSS ||  || align=right | 3.3 km || 
|-id=403 bgcolor=#d6d6d6
| 574403 ||  || — || May 7, 2005 || Kitt Peak || Spacewatch ||  || align=right | 2.6 km || 
|-id=404 bgcolor=#E9E9E9
| 574404 ||  || — || April 17, 2010 || Kitt Peak || Spacewatch ||  || align=right | 2.2 km || 
|-id=405 bgcolor=#E9E9E9
| 574405 ||  || — || June 14, 2010 || Mount Lemmon || Mount Lemmon Survey ||  || align=right | 1.3 km || 
|-id=406 bgcolor=#d6d6d6
| 574406 ||  || — || May 11, 2010 || Mount Lemmon || Mount Lemmon Survey ||  || align=right | 2.6 km || 
|-id=407 bgcolor=#d6d6d6
| 574407 ||  || — || June 13, 2010 || Mount Lemmon || Mount Lemmon Survey ||  || align=right | 2.5 km || 
|-id=408 bgcolor=#d6d6d6
| 574408 ||  || — || June 13, 2010 || Mount Lemmon || Mount Lemmon Survey ||  || align=right | 2.4 km || 
|-id=409 bgcolor=#d6d6d6
| 574409 ||  || — || June 12, 2010 || Nogales || M. Schwartz, P. R. Holvorcem ||  || align=right | 2.7 km || 
|-id=410 bgcolor=#fefefe
| 574410 ||  || — || June 21, 2007 || Kitt Peak || Spacewatch ||  || align=right data-sort-value="0.60" | 600 m || 
|-id=411 bgcolor=#fefefe
| 574411 ||  || — || February 16, 2010 || Kitt Peak || Spacewatch ||  || align=right data-sort-value="0.64" | 640 m || 
|-id=412 bgcolor=#d6d6d6
| 574412 ||  || — || September 6, 2016 || Mount Lemmon || Mount Lemmon Survey ||  || align=right | 2.4 km || 
|-id=413 bgcolor=#d6d6d6
| 574413 ||  || — || March 18, 2010 || Mount Lemmon || Mount Lemmon Survey ||  || align=right | 1.6 km || 
|-id=414 bgcolor=#E9E9E9
| 574414 ||  || — || November 5, 2016 || Haleakala || Pan-STARRS ||  || align=right | 1.3 km || 
|-id=415 bgcolor=#fefefe
| 574415 ||  || — || June 15, 2010 || Mount Lemmon || Mount Lemmon Survey ||  || align=right data-sort-value="0.62" | 620 m || 
|-id=416 bgcolor=#fefefe
| 574416 ||  || — || November 26, 2014 || Haleakala || Pan-STARRS ||  || align=right data-sort-value="0.70" | 700 m || 
|-id=417 bgcolor=#fefefe
| 574417 ||  || — || June 14, 2010 || Mount Lemmon || Mount Lemmon Survey ||  || align=right data-sort-value="0.67" | 670 m || 
|-id=418 bgcolor=#d6d6d6
| 574418 ||  || — || March 26, 2009 || Kitt Peak || Spacewatch ||  || align=right | 2.8 km || 
|-id=419 bgcolor=#fefefe
| 574419 ||  || — || June 21, 2010 || Mount Lemmon || Mount Lemmon Survey ||  || align=right data-sort-value="0.87" | 870 m || 
|-id=420 bgcolor=#d6d6d6
| 574420 ||  || — || January 13, 2008 || Kitt Peak || Spacewatch ||  || align=right | 2.9 km || 
|-id=421 bgcolor=#d6d6d6
| 574421 ||  || — || March 15, 2015 || Haleakala || Pan-STARRS ||  || align=right | 2.8 km || 
|-id=422 bgcolor=#d6d6d6
| 574422 ||  || — || August 10, 2016 || Haleakala || Pan-STARRS ||  || align=right | 2.7 km || 
|-id=423 bgcolor=#d6d6d6
| 574423 ||  || — || September 13, 2007 || Kitt Peak || Spacewatch ||  || align=right | 2.3 km || 
|-id=424 bgcolor=#d6d6d6
| 574424 ||  || — || October 4, 2016 || Mount Lemmon || Mount Lemmon Survey ||  || align=right | 2.5 km || 
|-id=425 bgcolor=#d6d6d6
| 574425 ||  || — || July 28, 2015 || Haleakala || Pan-STARRS ||  || align=right | 3.7 km || 
|-id=426 bgcolor=#fefefe
| 574426 ||  || — || December 30, 2011 || Kitt Peak || Spacewatch ||  || align=right data-sort-value="0.74" | 740 m || 
|-id=427 bgcolor=#fefefe
| 574427 ||  || — || November 30, 2011 || Kitt Peak || Spacewatch || H || align=right data-sort-value="0.54" | 540 m || 
|-id=428 bgcolor=#C2FFFF
| 574428 ||  || — || June 19, 2010 || Mount Lemmon || Mount Lemmon Survey || L5 || align=right | 7.1 km || 
|-id=429 bgcolor=#E9E9E9
| 574429 ||  || — || June 16, 2010 || Mount Lemmon || Mount Lemmon Survey ||  || align=right | 1.7 km || 
|-id=430 bgcolor=#d6d6d6
| 574430 ||  || — || August 2, 2011 || Haleakala || Pan-STARRS ||  || align=right | 3.1 km || 
|-id=431 bgcolor=#fefefe
| 574431 ||  || — || October 19, 2003 || Palomar || NEAT ||  || align=right data-sort-value="0.83" | 830 m || 
|-id=432 bgcolor=#d6d6d6
| 574432 ||  || — || March 7, 2018 || Haleakala || Pan-STARRS ||  || align=right | 2.3 km || 
|-id=433 bgcolor=#d6d6d6
| 574433 ||  || — || January 18, 2013 || Mount Lemmon || Mount Lemmon Survey || 3:2 || align=right | 4.4 km || 
|-id=434 bgcolor=#d6d6d6
| 574434 ||  || — || February 26, 2014 || Mount Lemmon || Mount Lemmon Survey ||  || align=right | 2.3 km || 
|-id=435 bgcolor=#fefefe
| 574435 ||  || — || July 20, 2010 || Cerro Burek || Alianza S4 Obs. || H || align=right data-sort-value="0.60" | 600 m || 
|-id=436 bgcolor=#d6d6d6
| 574436 ||  || — || December 26, 2006 || Kitt Peak || Spacewatch ||  || align=right | 2.6 km || 
|-id=437 bgcolor=#d6d6d6
| 574437 ||  || — || February 7, 2013 || Kitt Peak || Spacewatch ||  || align=right | 2.4 km || 
|-id=438 bgcolor=#d6d6d6
| 574438 ||  || — || November 17, 2011 || Mount Lemmon || Mount Lemmon Survey || 7:4 || align=right | 3.3 km || 
|-id=439 bgcolor=#d6d6d6
| 574439 ||  || — || September 14, 2010 || Mount Lemmon || Mount Lemmon Survey ||  || align=right | 2.1 km || 
|-id=440 bgcolor=#d6d6d6
| 574440 ||  || — || January 28, 2015 || Haleakala || Pan-STARRS ||  || align=right | 2.0 km || 
|-id=441 bgcolor=#C2E0FF
| 574441 ||  || — || July 19, 2010 || Haleakala || Pan-STARRS || SDOcritical || align=right | 375 km || 
|-id=442 bgcolor=#d6d6d6
| 574442 ||  || — || July 16, 2010 || Charleston || R. Holmes ||  || align=right | 2.2 km || 
|-id=443 bgcolor=#fefefe
| 574443 ||  || — || July 6, 2010 || Mount Lemmon || Mount Lemmon Survey ||  || align=right data-sort-value="0.66" | 660 m || 
|-id=444 bgcolor=#fefefe
| 574444 ||  || — || September 20, 2003 || Kitt Peak || Spacewatch ||  || align=right data-sort-value="0.83" | 830 m || 
|-id=445 bgcolor=#d6d6d6
| 574445 ||  || — || December 30, 2007 || Mount Lemmon || Mount Lemmon Survey ||  || align=right | 3.6 km || 
|-id=446 bgcolor=#d6d6d6
| 574446 ||  || — || August 13, 2010 || Mayhill-ISON || L. Elenin ||  || align=right | 2.2 km || 
|-id=447 bgcolor=#d6d6d6
| 574447 ||  || — || February 26, 2008 || Mount Lemmon || Mount Lemmon Survey ||  || align=right | 2.6 km || 
|-id=448 bgcolor=#d6d6d6
| 574448 ||  || — || August 10, 2010 || Kitt Peak || Spacewatch ||  || align=right | 2.7 km || 
|-id=449 bgcolor=#d6d6d6
| 574449 ||  || — || August 7, 2010 || XuYi || PMO NEO ||  || align=right | 3.3 km || 
|-id=450 bgcolor=#E9E9E9
| 574450 ||  || — || August 7, 2001 || Haleakala || AMOS ||  || align=right | 1.8 km || 
|-id=451 bgcolor=#fefefe
| 574451 ||  || — || August 14, 2010 || Kitt Peak || Spacewatch ||  || align=right data-sort-value="0.93" | 930 m || 
|-id=452 bgcolor=#fefefe
| 574452 ||  || — || January 25, 2009 || Kitt Peak || Spacewatch ||  || align=right data-sort-value="0.68" | 680 m || 
|-id=453 bgcolor=#d6d6d6
| 574453 ||  || — || August 13, 2010 || Kitt Peak || Spacewatch ||  || align=right | 2.5 km || 
|-id=454 bgcolor=#d6d6d6
| 574454 ||  || — || August 12, 2010 || Kitt Peak || Spacewatch ||  || align=right | 2.3 km || 
|-id=455 bgcolor=#fefefe
| 574455 ||  || — || August 10, 2010 || Kitt Peak || Spacewatch ||  || align=right data-sort-value="0.49" | 490 m || 
|-id=456 bgcolor=#fefefe
| 574456 ||  || — || September 16, 2010 || Catalina || CSS ||  || align=right data-sort-value="0.77" | 770 m || 
|-id=457 bgcolor=#d6d6d6
| 574457 ||  || — || September 17, 2010 || Catalina || CSS ||  || align=right | 3.6 km || 
|-id=458 bgcolor=#fefefe
| 574458 ||  || — || January 18, 2012 || Mount Lemmon || Mount Lemmon Survey ||  || align=right data-sort-value="0.78" | 780 m || 
|-id=459 bgcolor=#d6d6d6
| 574459 ||  || — || August 16, 2010 || Charleston || R. Holmes ||  || align=right | 2.7 km || 
|-id=460 bgcolor=#fefefe
| 574460 ||  || — || August 19, 2010 || Kitt Peak || Spacewatch ||  || align=right data-sort-value="0.62" | 620 m || 
|-id=461 bgcolor=#fefefe
| 574461 ||  || — || March 11, 2005 || Mount Lemmon || Mount Lemmon Survey ||  || align=right data-sort-value="0.61" | 610 m || 
|-id=462 bgcolor=#d6d6d6
| 574462 ||  || — || December 23, 2006 || Mount Lemmon || Mount Lemmon Survey ||  || align=right | 3.6 km || 
|-id=463 bgcolor=#d6d6d6
| 574463 ||  || — || September 1, 2010 || ESA OGS || ESA OGS ||  || align=right | 2.3 km || 
|-id=464 bgcolor=#d6d6d6
| 574464 ||  || — || September 2, 2010 || Mount Lemmon || Mount Lemmon Survey ||  || align=right | 2.4 km || 
|-id=465 bgcolor=#E9E9E9
| 574465 ||  || — || September 2, 2010 || Mount Lemmon || Mount Lemmon Survey ||  || align=right | 1.7 km || 
|-id=466 bgcolor=#d6d6d6
| 574466 ||  || — || September 3, 2010 || Socorro || LINEAR ||  || align=right | 2.7 km || 
|-id=467 bgcolor=#d6d6d6
| 574467 ||  || — || September 3, 2010 || Mount Lemmon || Mount Lemmon Survey ||  || align=right | 2.8 km || 
|-id=468 bgcolor=#d6d6d6
| 574468 ||  || — || September 3, 2010 || Mount Lemmon || Mount Lemmon Survey ||  || align=right | 3.0 km || 
|-id=469 bgcolor=#d6d6d6
| 574469 ||  || — || September 3, 2010 || Mount Lemmon || Mount Lemmon Survey ||  || align=right | 2.5 km || 
|-id=470 bgcolor=#fefefe
| 574470 ||  || — || January 16, 2005 || Kitt Peak || Spacewatch ||  || align=right data-sort-value="0.71" | 710 m || 
|-id=471 bgcolor=#d6d6d6
| 574471 ||  || — || September 1, 2010 || Mount Lemmon || Mount Lemmon Survey ||  || align=right | 2.3 km || 
|-id=472 bgcolor=#fefefe
| 574472 ||  || — || September 2, 2010 || Mount Lemmon || Mount Lemmon Survey ||  || align=right data-sort-value="0.71" | 710 m || 
|-id=473 bgcolor=#E9E9E9
| 574473 ||  || — || September 5, 2010 || Mount Lemmon || Mount Lemmon Survey ||  || align=right data-sort-value="0.87" | 870 m || 
|-id=474 bgcolor=#d6d6d6
| 574474 ||  || — || September 4, 2010 || Calvin-Rehoboth || L. A. Molnar, A. Vanden Heuvel || TIR || align=right | 3.4 km || 
|-id=475 bgcolor=#fefefe
| 574475 ||  || — || September 5, 2010 || Bergisch Gladbach || W. Bickel || H || align=right data-sort-value="0.54" | 540 m || 
|-id=476 bgcolor=#d6d6d6
| 574476 ||  || — || September 5, 2010 || Mount Lemmon || Mount Lemmon Survey ||  || align=right | 3.0 km || 
|-id=477 bgcolor=#d6d6d6
| 574477 ||  || — || September 25, 2005 || Kitt Peak || Spacewatch ||  || align=right | 2.1 km || 
|-id=478 bgcolor=#fefefe
| 574478 ||  || — || August 9, 2010 || Dauban || C. Rinner, F. Kugel ||  || align=right data-sort-value="0.77" | 770 m || 
|-id=479 bgcolor=#d6d6d6
| 574479 ||  || — || May 3, 2008 || Mount Lemmon || Mount Lemmon Survey ||  || align=right | 3.2 km || 
|-id=480 bgcolor=#fefefe
| 574480 ||  || — || September 2, 2010 || Mount Lemmon || Mount Lemmon Survey ||  || align=right data-sort-value="0.67" | 670 m || 
|-id=481 bgcolor=#d6d6d6
| 574481 ||  || — || September 3, 2010 || Mount Lemmon || Mount Lemmon Survey ||  || align=right | 3.4 km || 
|-id=482 bgcolor=#d6d6d6
| 574482 ||  || — || July 16, 2004 || Cerro Tololo || Cerro Tololo Obs. ||  || align=right | 2.5 km || 
|-id=483 bgcolor=#d6d6d6
| 574483 ||  || — || September 4, 2010 || Kitt Peak || Spacewatch ||  || align=right | 2.3 km || 
|-id=484 bgcolor=#fefefe
| 574484 ||  || — || September 4, 2010 || Kitt Peak || Spacewatch ||  || align=right data-sort-value="0.78" | 780 m || 
|-id=485 bgcolor=#fefefe
| 574485 ||  || — || September 5, 2010 || Mount Lemmon || Mount Lemmon Survey ||  || align=right data-sort-value="0.66" | 660 m || 
|-id=486 bgcolor=#d6d6d6
| 574486 ||  || — || September 23, 2005 || Kitt Peak || Spacewatch ||  || align=right | 1.8 km || 
|-id=487 bgcolor=#d6d6d6
| 574487 ||  || — || September 5, 2010 || Mount Lemmon || Mount Lemmon Survey ||  || align=right | 1.8 km || 
|-id=488 bgcolor=#d6d6d6
| 574488 ||  || — || September 29, 1999 || Catalina || CSS || TIR || align=right | 3.2 km || 
|-id=489 bgcolor=#fefefe
| 574489 ||  || — || October 1, 1999 || Kitt Peak || Spacewatch ||  || align=right data-sort-value="0.70" | 700 m || 
|-id=490 bgcolor=#fefefe
| 574490 ||  || — || September 2, 2010 || Mount Lemmon || Mount Lemmon Survey ||  || align=right data-sort-value="0.85" | 850 m || 
|-id=491 bgcolor=#fefefe
| 574491 ||  || — || September 21, 2003 || Kitt Peak || Spacewatch ||  || align=right | 1.2 km || 
|-id=492 bgcolor=#fefefe
| 574492 ||  || — || September 11, 2010 || Mount Lemmon || Mount Lemmon Survey ||  || align=right data-sort-value="0.74" | 740 m || 
|-id=493 bgcolor=#d6d6d6
| 574493 ||  || — || September 2, 2010 || Mount Lemmon || Mount Lemmon Survey ||  || align=right | 2.3 km || 
|-id=494 bgcolor=#fefefe
| 574494 ||  || — || September 2, 2010 || Mount Lemmon || Mount Lemmon Survey ||  || align=right data-sort-value="0.70" | 700 m || 
|-id=495 bgcolor=#fefefe
| 574495 ||  || — || August 12, 2010 || Kitt Peak || Spacewatch ||  || align=right data-sort-value="0.64" | 640 m || 
|-id=496 bgcolor=#d6d6d6
| 574496 ||  || — || August 10, 2010 || Kitt Peak || Spacewatch ||  || align=right | 2.6 km || 
|-id=497 bgcolor=#d6d6d6
| 574497 ||  || — || November 6, 2005 || Kitt Peak || Spacewatch ||  || align=right | 2.9 km || 
|-id=498 bgcolor=#d6d6d6
| 574498 ||  || — || September 4, 2010 || Mount Lemmon || Mount Lemmon Survey ||  || align=right | 2.5 km || 
|-id=499 bgcolor=#d6d6d6
| 574499 ||  || — || October 12, 1999 || Kitt Peak || Spacewatch ||  || align=right | 2.9 km || 
|-id=500 bgcolor=#d6d6d6
| 574500 ||  || — || February 8, 2013 || Haleakala || Pan-STARRS ||  || align=right | 2.5 km || 
|}

574501–574600 

|-bgcolor=#d6d6d6
| 574501 ||  || — || February 20, 2002 || Kitt Peak || Spacewatch ||  || align=right | 2.3 km || 
|-id=502 bgcolor=#fefefe
| 574502 ||  || — || September 6, 2010 || La Sagra || OAM Obs. || NYS || align=right data-sort-value="0.75" | 750 m || 
|-id=503 bgcolor=#d6d6d6
| 574503 ||  || — || September 10, 2010 || Dauban || C. Rinner, F. Kugel ||  || align=right | 2.4 km || 
|-id=504 bgcolor=#d6d6d6
| 574504 ||  || — || February 8, 2008 || Kitt Peak || Spacewatch ||  || align=right | 2.7 km || 
|-id=505 bgcolor=#fefefe
| 574505 ||  || — || March 19, 2009 || Mount Lemmon || Mount Lemmon Survey ||  || align=right data-sort-value="0.86" | 860 m || 
|-id=506 bgcolor=#d6d6d6
| 574506 Sopronilíceum ||  ||  || August 8, 2004 || Piszkesteto || K. Sárneczky, T. Szalai ||  || align=right | 2.9 km || 
|-id=507 bgcolor=#d6d6d6
| 574507 ||  || — || August 23, 2004 || Kitt Peak || Spacewatch || HYG || align=right | 2.1 km || 
|-id=508 bgcolor=#fefefe
| 574508 ||  || — || September 11, 2010 || Kitt Peak || Spacewatch ||  || align=right data-sort-value="0.81" | 810 m || 
|-id=509 bgcolor=#fefefe
| 574509 ||  || — || September 9, 2010 || Bisei SG Center || N. Hashimoto, T. Sakamoto ||  || align=right data-sort-value="0.91" | 910 m || 
|-id=510 bgcolor=#fefefe
| 574510 ||  || — || September 11, 2010 || Catalina || CSS || H || align=right data-sort-value="0.78" | 780 m || 
|-id=511 bgcolor=#fefefe
| 574511 ||  || — || September 14, 2010 || La Sagra || OAM Obs. || MAS || align=right data-sort-value="0.67" | 670 m || 
|-id=512 bgcolor=#fefefe
| 574512 ||  || — || September 14, 2010 || Plana || F. Fratev ||  || align=right data-sort-value="0.74" | 740 m || 
|-id=513 bgcolor=#d6d6d6
| 574513 ||  || — || September 11, 2010 || Kitt Peak || Spacewatch || EOS || align=right | 1.3 km || 
|-id=514 bgcolor=#d6d6d6
| 574514 ||  || — || September 11, 2010 || Kitt Peak || Spacewatch ||  || align=right | 2.8 km || 
|-id=515 bgcolor=#d6d6d6
| 574515 ||  || — || September 9, 2004 || Kitt Peak || Spacewatch ||  || align=right | 2.2 km || 
|-id=516 bgcolor=#d6d6d6
| 574516 ||  || — || September 14, 2010 || Mount Lemmon || Mount Lemmon Survey ||  || align=right | 2.7 km || 
|-id=517 bgcolor=#fefefe
| 574517 ||  || — || September 9, 2010 || Kitt Peak || Spacewatch || H || align=right data-sort-value="0.56" | 560 m || 
|-id=518 bgcolor=#fefefe
| 574518 ||  || — || October 1, 2003 || Kitt Peak || Spacewatch ||  || align=right data-sort-value="0.49" | 490 m || 
|-id=519 bgcolor=#fefefe
| 574519 ||  || — || September 11, 2010 || Mount Lemmon || Mount Lemmon Survey ||  || align=right data-sort-value="0.76" | 760 m || 
|-id=520 bgcolor=#fefefe
| 574520 ||  || — || September 11, 2010 || Kitt Peak || Spacewatch ||  || align=right data-sort-value="0.74" | 740 m || 
|-id=521 bgcolor=#fefefe
| 574521 ||  || — || September 12, 2010 || Kitt Peak || Spacewatch ||  || align=right data-sort-value="0.67" | 670 m || 
|-id=522 bgcolor=#d6d6d6
| 574522 ||  || — || August 12, 2004 || Palomar || NEAT ||  || align=right | 3.4 km || 
|-id=523 bgcolor=#fefefe
| 574523 ||  || — || December 5, 2007 || Kitt Peak || Spacewatch ||  || align=right data-sort-value="0.70" | 700 m || 
|-id=524 bgcolor=#d6d6d6
| 574524 ||  || — || September 13, 2010 || Andrushivka || P. Kyrylenko, Y. Ivaščenko ||  || align=right | 3.2 km || 
|-id=525 bgcolor=#d6d6d6
| 574525 ||  || — || December 27, 2006 || Mount Lemmon || Mount Lemmon Survey ||  || align=right | 2.7 km || 
|-id=526 bgcolor=#d6d6d6
| 574526 ||  || — || September 10, 2010 || Mount Lemmon || Mount Lemmon Survey ||  || align=right | 2.5 km || 
|-id=527 bgcolor=#d6d6d6
| 574527 ||  || — || September 14, 2010 || Kitt Peak || Spacewatch ||  || align=right | 3.3 km || 
|-id=528 bgcolor=#d6d6d6
| 574528 ||  || — || November 26, 2005 || Mount Lemmon || Mount Lemmon Survey ||  || align=right | 2.6 km || 
|-id=529 bgcolor=#d6d6d6
| 574529 ||  || — || September 14, 2010 || Mount Lemmon || Mount Lemmon Survey ||  || align=right | 2.9 km || 
|-id=530 bgcolor=#d6d6d6
| 574530 ||  || — || September 15, 2010 || Plana || F. Fratev ||  || align=right | 2.4 km || 
|-id=531 bgcolor=#d6d6d6
| 574531 ||  || — || March 18, 2002 || Kitt Peak || M. W. Buie, D. E. Trilling ||  || align=right | 2.4 km || 
|-id=532 bgcolor=#d6d6d6
| 574532 ||  || — || July 16, 2004 || Cerro Tololo || Cerro Tololo Obs. ||  || align=right | 3.4 km || 
|-id=533 bgcolor=#d6d6d6
| 574533 ||  || — || September 15, 2010 || Kitt Peak || Spacewatch ||  || align=right | 3.0 km || 
|-id=534 bgcolor=#fefefe
| 574534 ||  || — || March 11, 2005 || Mount Lemmon || Mount Lemmon Survey ||  || align=right data-sort-value="0.85" | 850 m || 
|-id=535 bgcolor=#d6d6d6
| 574535 ||  || — || October 25, 2005 || Mount Lemmon || Mount Lemmon Survey ||  || align=right | 2.4 km || 
|-id=536 bgcolor=#fefefe
| 574536 ||  || — || October 17, 2003 || Kitt Peak || Spacewatch ||  || align=right data-sort-value="0.95" | 950 m || 
|-id=537 bgcolor=#fefefe
| 574537 ||  || — || October 3, 2003 || Kitt Peak || Spacewatch ||  || align=right data-sort-value="0.88" | 880 m || 
|-id=538 bgcolor=#d6d6d6
| 574538 ||  || — || June 15, 2010 || Mount Lemmon || Mount Lemmon Survey ||  || align=right | 2.4 km || 
|-id=539 bgcolor=#d6d6d6
| 574539 ||  || — || September 3, 2010 || Mount Lemmon || Mount Lemmon Survey ||  || align=right | 3.1 km || 
|-id=540 bgcolor=#d6d6d6
| 574540 ||  || — || September 4, 2010 || Mount Lemmon || Mount Lemmon Survey ||  || align=right | 2.2 km || 
|-id=541 bgcolor=#fefefe
| 574541 ||  || — || September 4, 2010 || Mount Lemmon || Mount Lemmon Survey ||  || align=right data-sort-value="0.94" | 940 m || 
|-id=542 bgcolor=#d6d6d6
| 574542 ||  || — || April 23, 2009 || Kitt Peak || Spacewatch ||  || align=right | 2.2 km || 
|-id=543 bgcolor=#d6d6d6
| 574543 ||  || — || June 21, 2010 || Mount Lemmon || Mount Lemmon Survey ||  || align=right | 3.1 km || 
|-id=544 bgcolor=#fefefe
| 574544 ||  || — || March 12, 2005 || Mount Lemmon || Mount Lemmon Survey ||  || align=right data-sort-value="0.78" | 780 m || 
|-id=545 bgcolor=#d6d6d6
| 574545 ||  || — || September 2, 2010 || Mount Lemmon || Mount Lemmon Survey ||  || align=right | 2.4 km || 
|-id=546 bgcolor=#fefefe
| 574546 Kondorgusztáv ||  ||  || September 6, 2010 || Piszkesteto || K. Sárneczky, Z. Kuli ||  || align=right data-sort-value="0.67" | 670 m || 
|-id=547 bgcolor=#d6d6d6
| 574547 ||  || — || January 27, 2007 || Kitt Peak || Spacewatch ||  || align=right | 3.3 km || 
|-id=548 bgcolor=#d6d6d6
| 574548 ||  || — || April 7, 2007 || Mauna Kea || Mauna Kea Obs. ||  || align=right | 3.3 km || 
|-id=549 bgcolor=#d6d6d6
| 574549 ||  || — || November 25, 2011 || Haleakala || Pan-STARRS || EOS || align=right | 2.4 km || 
|-id=550 bgcolor=#d6d6d6
| 574550 ||  || — || November 12, 2005 || Kitt Peak || Spacewatch ||  || align=right | 2.5 km || 
|-id=551 bgcolor=#d6d6d6
| 574551 ||  || — || December 6, 2011 || Haleakala || Pan-STARRS ||  || align=right | 3.2 km || 
|-id=552 bgcolor=#d6d6d6
| 574552 ||  || — || November 7, 2010 || Catalina || CSS || 7:4 || align=right | 4.9 km || 
|-id=553 bgcolor=#d6d6d6
| 574553 ||  || — || September 3, 2010 || Mount Lemmon || Mount Lemmon Survey ||  || align=right | 2.3 km || 
|-id=554 bgcolor=#d6d6d6
| 574554 ||  || — || September 3, 2010 || Mount Lemmon || Mount Lemmon Survey ||  || align=right | 2.0 km || 
|-id=555 bgcolor=#d6d6d6
| 574555 ||  || — || April 9, 2008 || Mount Lemmon || Mount Lemmon Survey ||  || align=right | 2.9 km || 
|-id=556 bgcolor=#d6d6d6
| 574556 ||  || — || December 26, 2011 || Mount Lemmon || Mount Lemmon Survey ||  || align=right | 2.7 km || 
|-id=557 bgcolor=#d6d6d6
| 574557 ||  || — || December 11, 2012 || Mount Lemmon || Mount Lemmon Survey ||  || align=right | 3.7 km || 
|-id=558 bgcolor=#d6d6d6
| 574558 ||  || — || October 18, 2011 || Kitt Peak || Spacewatch ||  || align=right | 2.6 km || 
|-id=559 bgcolor=#d6d6d6
| 574559 ||  || — || September 27, 2016 || Mount Lemmon || Mount Lemmon Survey ||  || align=right | 2.5 km || 
|-id=560 bgcolor=#d6d6d6
| 574560 ||  || — || May 25, 2003 || Kitt Peak || Spacewatch ||  || align=right | 2.9 km || 
|-id=561 bgcolor=#d6d6d6
| 574561 ||  || — || April 9, 2014 || Haleakala || Pan-STARRS ||  || align=right | 2.8 km || 
|-id=562 bgcolor=#d6d6d6
| 574562 ||  || — || January 15, 2008 || Kitt Peak || Spacewatch ||  || align=right | 3.2 km || 
|-id=563 bgcolor=#d6d6d6
| 574563 ||  || — || September 3, 2010 || Mount Lemmon || Mount Lemmon Survey ||  || align=right | 2.8 km || 
|-id=564 bgcolor=#d6d6d6
| 574564 ||  || — || January 19, 2013 || Mount Lemmon || Mount Lemmon Survey ||  || align=right | 2.9 km || 
|-id=565 bgcolor=#d6d6d6
| 574565 ||  || — || January 19, 2013 || Mount Lemmon || Mount Lemmon Survey ||  || align=right | 3.2 km || 
|-id=566 bgcolor=#d6d6d6
| 574566 ||  || — || May 6, 2014 || Haleakala || Pan-STARRS ||  || align=right | 2.3 km || 
|-id=567 bgcolor=#d6d6d6
| 574567 ||  || — || November 24, 2011 || Haleakala || Pan-STARRS ||  || align=right | 2.9 km || 
|-id=568 bgcolor=#d6d6d6
| 574568 ||  || — || September 3, 2010 || Mount Lemmon || Mount Lemmon Survey ||  || align=right | 2.5 km || 
|-id=569 bgcolor=#d6d6d6
| 574569 ||  || — || August 13, 2010 || Kitt Peak || Spacewatch ||  || align=right | 2.4 km || 
|-id=570 bgcolor=#d6d6d6
| 574570 ||  || — || November 4, 2011 || Zelenchukskaya Stn || T. V. Kryachko, B. Satovski ||  || align=right | 3.0 km || 
|-id=571 bgcolor=#d6d6d6
| 574571 ||  || — || February 3, 2013 || Haleakala || Pan-STARRS ||  || align=right | 2.4 km || 
|-id=572 bgcolor=#d6d6d6
| 574572 ||  || — || January 30, 2008 || Mount Lemmon || Mount Lemmon Survey ||  || align=right | 2.6 km || 
|-id=573 bgcolor=#d6d6d6
| 574573 ||  || — || October 26, 2011 || Haleakala || Pan-STARRS ||  || align=right | 2.4 km || 
|-id=574 bgcolor=#d6d6d6
| 574574 ||  || — || September 4, 2010 || Mount Lemmon || Mount Lemmon Survey ||  || align=right | 2.0 km || 
|-id=575 bgcolor=#d6d6d6
| 574575 ||  || — || May 23, 2014 || Haleakala || Pan-STARRS ||  || align=right | 2.7 km || 
|-id=576 bgcolor=#d6d6d6
| 574576 ||  || — || April 30, 2014 || Haleakala || Pan-STARRS ||  || align=right | 1.8 km || 
|-id=577 bgcolor=#d6d6d6
| 574577 ||  || — || July 9, 2015 || Haleakala || Pan-STARRS ||  || align=right | 2.9 km || 
|-id=578 bgcolor=#d6d6d6
| 574578 ||  || — || September 14, 2010 || Kitt Peak || Spacewatch ||  || align=right | 2.2 km || 
|-id=579 bgcolor=#fefefe
| 574579 ||  || — || September 4, 2010 || Mount Lemmon || Mount Lemmon Survey ||  || align=right data-sort-value="0.65" | 650 m || 
|-id=580 bgcolor=#fefefe
| 574580 ||  || — || September 2, 2010 || Mount Lemmon || Mount Lemmon Survey ||  || align=right data-sort-value="0.62" | 620 m || 
|-id=581 bgcolor=#d6d6d6
| 574581 ||  || — || September 4, 2010 || Mount Lemmon || Mount Lemmon Survey ||  || align=right | 2.1 km || 
|-id=582 bgcolor=#d6d6d6
| 574582 ||  || — || September 11, 2010 || Kitt Peak || Spacewatch ||  || align=right | 2.3 km || 
|-id=583 bgcolor=#fefefe
| 574583 ||  || — || September 2, 2010 || Mount Lemmon || Mount Lemmon Survey ||  || align=right data-sort-value="0.83" | 830 m || 
|-id=584 bgcolor=#d6d6d6
| 574584 ||  || — || September 11, 2010 || Mount Lemmon || Mount Lemmon Survey ||  || align=right | 2.3 km || 
|-id=585 bgcolor=#d6d6d6
| 574585 ||  || — || September 3, 2010 || Mount Lemmon || Mount Lemmon Survey ||  || align=right | 2.4 km || 
|-id=586 bgcolor=#d6d6d6
| 574586 ||  || — || September 15, 2010 || Kitt Peak || Spacewatch ||  || align=right | 2.3 km || 
|-id=587 bgcolor=#E9E9E9
| 574587 ||  || — || September 5, 2010 || Mount Lemmon || Mount Lemmon Survey ||  || align=right | 1.2 km || 
|-id=588 bgcolor=#d6d6d6
| 574588 ||  || — || September 16, 2010 || Mount Lemmon || Mount Lemmon Survey ||  || align=right | 2.1 km || 
|-id=589 bgcolor=#fefefe
| 574589 ||  || — || March 10, 2005 || Mount Lemmon || Mount Lemmon Survey ||  || align=right data-sort-value="0.67" | 670 m || 
|-id=590 bgcolor=#fefefe
| 574590 ||  || — || March 16, 2005 || Catalina || CSS ||  || align=right data-sort-value="0.97" | 970 m || 
|-id=591 bgcolor=#fefefe
| 574591 ||  || — || January 11, 2008 || Kitt Peak || Spacewatch ||  || align=right data-sort-value="0.73" | 730 m || 
|-id=592 bgcolor=#fefefe
| 574592 ||  || — || September 29, 2010 || Mount Lemmon || Mount Lemmon Survey ||  || align=right data-sort-value="0.61" | 610 m || 
|-id=593 bgcolor=#fefefe
| 574593 ||  || — || September 12, 2010 || Kitt Peak || Spacewatch ||  || align=right data-sort-value="0.73" | 730 m || 
|-id=594 bgcolor=#d6d6d6
| 574594 ||  || — || September 30, 2010 || Piszkesteto || K. Sárneczky ||  || align=right | 2.6 km || 
|-id=595 bgcolor=#fefefe
| 574595 ||  || — || September 17, 2010 || Charleston || R. Holmes ||  || align=right data-sort-value="0.53" | 530 m || 
|-id=596 bgcolor=#d6d6d6
| 574596 ||  || — || November 23, 2006 || Mount Lemmon || Mount Lemmon Survey ||  || align=right | 3.0 km || 
|-id=597 bgcolor=#E9E9E9
| 574597 ||  || — || February 20, 2012 || Haleakala || Pan-STARRS ||  || align=right | 1.1 km || 
|-id=598 bgcolor=#d6d6d6
| 574598 ||  || — || February 13, 2002 || Apache Point || SDSS Collaboration || EOS || align=right | 2.1 km || 
|-id=599 bgcolor=#d6d6d6
| 574599 ||  || — || May 7, 2008 || Kitt Peak || Spacewatch ||  || align=right | 2.5 km || 
|-id=600 bgcolor=#d6d6d6
| 574600 ||  || — || September 30, 2010 || Mount Lemmon || Mount Lemmon Survey ||  || align=right | 2.9 km || 
|}

574601–574700 

|-bgcolor=#d6d6d6
| 574601 ||  || — || September 17, 2010 || Mount Lemmon || Mount Lemmon Survey ||  || align=right | 3.3 km || 
|-id=602 bgcolor=#d6d6d6
| 574602 ||  || — || September 29, 2010 || Mount Lemmon || Mount Lemmon Survey ||  || align=right | 2.2 km || 
|-id=603 bgcolor=#d6d6d6
| 574603 ||  || — || September 16, 2010 || Mount Lemmon || Mount Lemmon Survey ||  || align=right | 2.3 km || 
|-id=604 bgcolor=#fefefe
| 574604 ||  || — || November 17, 2014 || Haleakala || Pan-STARRS ||  || align=right data-sort-value="0.90" | 900 m || 
|-id=605 bgcolor=#fefefe
| 574605 ||  || — || December 5, 2007 || Mount Lemmon || Mount Lemmon Survey ||  || align=right data-sort-value="0.85" | 850 m || 
|-id=606 bgcolor=#fefefe
| 574606 ||  || — || January 18, 2015 || Mount Lemmon || Mount Lemmon Survey ||  || align=right data-sort-value="0.65" | 650 m || 
|-id=607 bgcolor=#d6d6d6
| 574607 ||  || — || September 18, 2010 || Mount Lemmon || Mount Lemmon Survey || 7:4 || align=right | 2.4 km || 
|-id=608 bgcolor=#d6d6d6
| 574608 ||  || — || September 29, 2010 || Mount Lemmon || Mount Lemmon Survey ||  || align=right | 2.4 km || 
|-id=609 bgcolor=#d6d6d6
| 574609 ||  || — || September 29, 2010 || Mount Lemmon || Mount Lemmon Survey ||  || align=right | 2.3 km || 
|-id=610 bgcolor=#d6d6d6
| 574610 ||  || — || September 18, 2010 || Mount Lemmon || Mount Lemmon Survey ||  || align=right | 2.3 km || 
|-id=611 bgcolor=#d6d6d6
| 574611 ||  || — || September 16, 2010 || Mount Lemmon || Mount Lemmon Survey ||  || align=right | 2.3 km || 
|-id=612 bgcolor=#d6d6d6
| 574612 ||  || — || September 19, 2010 || Kitt Peak || Spacewatch ||  || align=right | 2.6 km || 
|-id=613 bgcolor=#fefefe
| 574613 ||  || — || September 4, 2010 || Kitt Peak || Spacewatch ||  || align=right data-sort-value="0.66" | 660 m || 
|-id=614 bgcolor=#fefefe
| 574614 ||  || — || September 15, 2010 || Kitt Peak || Spacewatch ||  || align=right data-sort-value="0.69" | 690 m || 
|-id=615 bgcolor=#fefefe
| 574615 ||  || — || September 1, 2010 || Mount Lemmon || Mount Lemmon Survey ||  || align=right data-sort-value="0.69" | 690 m || 
|-id=616 bgcolor=#d6d6d6
| 574616 ||  || — || September 2, 2010 || Mount Lemmon || Mount Lemmon Survey ||  || align=right | 2.6 km || 
|-id=617 bgcolor=#d6d6d6
| 574617 ||  || — || October 1, 2010 || La Sagra || OAM Obs. ||  || align=right | 3.0 km || 
|-id=618 bgcolor=#d6d6d6
| 574618 ||  || — || October 3, 2010 || Kitt Peak || Spacewatch ||  || align=right | 2.4 km || 
|-id=619 bgcolor=#d6d6d6
| 574619 ||  || — || October 3, 2010 || Kitt Peak || Spacewatch ||  || align=right | 2.4 km || 
|-id=620 bgcolor=#fefefe
| 574620 ||  || — || April 12, 2005 || Kitt Peak || Kitt Peak Obs. ||  || align=right data-sort-value="0.61" | 610 m || 
|-id=621 bgcolor=#d6d6d6
| 574621 ||  || — || October 2, 2010 || Kitt Peak || Spacewatch ||  || align=right | 3.0 km || 
|-id=622 bgcolor=#fefefe
| 574622 ||  || — || September 10, 2010 || Kitt Peak || Spacewatch ||  || align=right data-sort-value="0.74" | 740 m || 
|-id=623 bgcolor=#d6d6d6
| 574623 ||  || — || October 2, 2010 || Kitt Peak || Spacewatch ||  || align=right | 2.3 km || 
|-id=624 bgcolor=#E9E9E9
| 574624 ||  || — || October 31, 2006 || Kitt Peak || Spacewatch ||  || align=right data-sort-value="0.68" | 680 m || 
|-id=625 bgcolor=#d6d6d6
| 574625 ||  || — || October 8, 2010 || Kitt Peak || Spacewatch ||  || align=right | 2.1 km || 
|-id=626 bgcolor=#fefefe
| 574626 ||  || — || August 24, 2006 || Palomar || NEAT || (5026) || align=right data-sort-value="0.87" | 870 m || 
|-id=627 bgcolor=#d6d6d6
| 574627 ||  || — || October 5, 2010 || La Sagra || OAM Obs. ||  || align=right | 2.5 km || 
|-id=628 bgcolor=#fefefe
| 574628 ||  || — || December 16, 2007 || Mount Lemmon || Mount Lemmon Survey ||  || align=right data-sort-value="0.87" | 870 m || 
|-id=629 bgcolor=#d6d6d6
| 574629 ||  || — || October 8, 2010 || Kitt Peak || Spacewatch ||  || align=right | 2.5 km || 
|-id=630 bgcolor=#d6d6d6
| 574630 ||  || — || September 16, 2010 || Mount Lemmon || Mount Lemmon Survey ||  || align=right | 2.1 km || 
|-id=631 bgcolor=#fefefe
| 574631 ||  || — || October 16, 2006 || Mount Lemmon || Mount Lemmon Survey ||  || align=right data-sort-value="0.87" | 870 m || 
|-id=632 bgcolor=#fefefe
| 574632 ||  || — || October 8, 2010 || Catalina || CSS ||  || align=right data-sort-value="0.79" | 790 m || 
|-id=633 bgcolor=#E9E9E9
| 574633 ||  || — || October 8, 2010 || Kitt Peak || Spacewatch ||  || align=right data-sort-value="0.82" | 820 m || 
|-id=634 bgcolor=#d6d6d6
| 574634 ||  || — || October 8, 2010 || Kitt Peak || Spacewatch || 7:4 || align=right | 2.5 km || 
|-id=635 bgcolor=#fefefe
| 574635 ||  || — || September 6, 2010 || Piszkesteto || Z. Kuli ||  || align=right data-sort-value="0.98" | 980 m || 
|-id=636 bgcolor=#fefefe
| 574636 ||  || — || October 9, 2010 || Kitt Peak || Spacewatch ||  || align=right data-sort-value="0.92" | 920 m || 
|-id=637 bgcolor=#d6d6d6
| 574637 ||  || — || September 15, 2010 || Kitt Peak || Spacewatch ||  || align=right | 2.2 km || 
|-id=638 bgcolor=#d6d6d6
| 574638 ||  || — || October 9, 2010 || Kitt Peak || Spacewatch ||  || align=right | 2.3 km || 
|-id=639 bgcolor=#d6d6d6
| 574639 ||  || — || September 30, 2010 || Mount Lemmon || Mount Lemmon Survey ||  || align=right | 2.0 km || 
|-id=640 bgcolor=#fefefe
| 574640 ||  || — || March 21, 2009 || Mount Lemmon || Mount Lemmon Survey ||  || align=right data-sort-value="0.72" | 720 m || 
|-id=641 bgcolor=#d6d6d6
| 574641 ||  || — || March 28, 2008 || Kitt Peak || Spacewatch ||  || align=right | 2.9 km || 
|-id=642 bgcolor=#d6d6d6
| 574642 ||  || — || March 30, 2008 || Kitt Peak || Spacewatch ||  || align=right | 2.7 km || 
|-id=643 bgcolor=#d6d6d6
| 574643 ||  || — || April 28, 2008 || Kitt Peak || Spacewatch ||  || align=right | 3.3 km || 
|-id=644 bgcolor=#d6d6d6
| 574644 ||  || — || October 9, 2010 || Kitt Peak || Spacewatch ||  || align=right | 2.5 km || 
|-id=645 bgcolor=#d6d6d6
| 574645 ||  || — || October 1, 2010 || Mount Lemmon || Mount Lemmon Survey ||  || align=right | 2.2 km || 
|-id=646 bgcolor=#E9E9E9
| 574646 ||  || — || October 9, 2010 || Mount Lemmon || Mount Lemmon Survey ||  || align=right data-sort-value="0.82" | 820 m || 
|-id=647 bgcolor=#d6d6d6
| 574647 ||  || — || October 9, 2010 || Kitt Peak || Spacewatch ||  || align=right | 2.3 km || 
|-id=648 bgcolor=#fefefe
| 574648 ||  || — || February 26, 2009 || Mount Lemmon || Mount Lemmon Survey ||  || align=right data-sort-value="0.66" | 660 m || 
|-id=649 bgcolor=#fefefe
| 574649 ||  || — || August 17, 2006 || Palomar || NEAT || NYS || align=right data-sort-value="0.71" | 710 m || 
|-id=650 bgcolor=#fefefe
| 574650 ||  || — || October 11, 2010 || Catalina || CSS ||  || align=right data-sort-value="0.73" | 730 m || 
|-id=651 bgcolor=#d6d6d6
| 574651 ||  || — || October 11, 2010 || Mount Lemmon || Mount Lemmon Survey ||  || align=right | 3.3 km || 
|-id=652 bgcolor=#fefefe
| 574652 ||  || — || April 30, 2009 || Mount Lemmon || Mount Lemmon Survey ||  || align=right data-sort-value="0.74" | 740 m || 
|-id=653 bgcolor=#fefefe
| 574653 ||  || — || October 11, 2010 || Mount Lemmon || Mount Lemmon Survey ||  || align=right data-sort-value="0.58" | 580 m || 
|-id=654 bgcolor=#d6d6d6
| 574654 ||  || — || October 11, 2010 || Mount Lemmon || Mount Lemmon Survey ||  || align=right | 3.5 km || 
|-id=655 bgcolor=#E9E9E9
| 574655 ||  || — || October 11, 2010 || Mount Lemmon || Mount Lemmon Survey ||  || align=right | 1.4 km || 
|-id=656 bgcolor=#d6d6d6
| 574656 ||  || — || September 10, 2010 || Kitt Peak || Spacewatch ||  || align=right | 3.7 km || 
|-id=657 bgcolor=#d6d6d6
| 574657 ||  || — || March 29, 2008 || Kitt Peak || Spacewatch ||  || align=right | 2.9 km || 
|-id=658 bgcolor=#d6d6d6
| 574658 ||  || — || November 29, 2005 || Kitt Peak || Spacewatch ||  || align=right | 2.3 km || 
|-id=659 bgcolor=#fefefe
| 574659 ||  || — || October 10, 2010 || Mount Lemmon || Mount Lemmon Survey ||  || align=right data-sort-value="0.61" | 610 m || 
|-id=660 bgcolor=#FFC2E0
| 574660 ||  || — || October 14, 2010 || Mount Lemmon || Mount Lemmon Survey || APO || align=right data-sort-value="0.22" | 220 m || 
|-id=661 bgcolor=#fefefe
| 574661 ||  || — || September 14, 2010 || Dauban || C. Rinner, F. Kugel || NYS || align=right data-sort-value="0.68" | 680 m || 
|-id=662 bgcolor=#d6d6d6
| 574662 ||  || — || August 14, 2004 || Cerro Tololo || Cerro Tololo Obs. ||  || align=right | 2.6 km || 
|-id=663 bgcolor=#fefefe
| 574663 ||  || — || August 27, 2006 || Kitt Peak || Spacewatch ||  || align=right data-sort-value="0.60" | 600 m || 
|-id=664 bgcolor=#d6d6d6
| 574664 ||  || — || November 1, 1999 || Kitt Peak || Spacewatch ||  || align=right | 2.8 km || 
|-id=665 bgcolor=#d6d6d6
| 574665 ||  || — || November 1, 2010 || Mount Lemmon || Mount Lemmon Survey ||  || align=right | 3.3 km || 
|-id=666 bgcolor=#fefefe
| 574666 ||  || — || October 9, 2010 || Palomar || PTF ||  || align=right data-sort-value="0.74" | 740 m || 
|-id=667 bgcolor=#fefefe
| 574667 ||  || — || November 2, 2010 || Mount Lemmon || Mount Lemmon Survey ||  || align=right data-sort-value="0.96" | 960 m || 
|-id=668 bgcolor=#d6d6d6
| 574668 ||  || — || March 13, 2013 || Haleakala || Pan-STARRS ||  || align=right | 2.6 km || 
|-id=669 bgcolor=#fefefe
| 574669 ||  || — || October 12, 2010 || Mount Lemmon || Mount Lemmon Survey ||  || align=right data-sort-value="0.75" | 750 m || 
|-id=670 bgcolor=#fefefe
| 574670 ||  || — || October 12, 2010 || Mount Lemmon || Mount Lemmon Survey ||  || align=right data-sort-value="0.62" | 620 m || 
|-id=671 bgcolor=#d6d6d6
| 574671 ||  || — || February 5, 2013 || Kitt Peak || Spacewatch || 7:4 || align=right | 3.2 km || 
|-id=672 bgcolor=#fefefe
| 574672 ||  || — || October 1, 2010 || Mount Lemmon || Mount Lemmon Survey ||  || align=right data-sort-value="0.61" | 610 m || 
|-id=673 bgcolor=#fefefe
| 574673 ||  || — || October 1, 2010 || Mount Lemmon || Mount Lemmon Survey ||  || align=right data-sort-value="0.70" | 700 m || 
|-id=674 bgcolor=#d6d6d6
| 574674 ||  || — || October 10, 2016 || Mount Lemmon || Mount Lemmon Survey ||  || align=right | 2.7 km || 
|-id=675 bgcolor=#d6d6d6
| 574675 ||  || — || October 11, 2010 || Mount Lemmon || Mount Lemmon Survey ||  || align=right | 1.9 km || 
|-id=676 bgcolor=#d6d6d6
| 574676 ||  || — || October 17, 2010 || Kitt Peak || Spacewatch ||  || align=right | 3.3 km || 
|-id=677 bgcolor=#d6d6d6
| 574677 ||  || — || October 28, 2010 || Mount Lemmon || Mount Lemmon Survey ||  || align=right | 2.8 km || 
|-id=678 bgcolor=#E9E9E9
| 574678 ||  || — || October 28, 2010 || Mount Lemmon || Mount Lemmon Survey ||  || align=right | 1.1 km || 
|-id=679 bgcolor=#d6d6d6
| 574679 ||  || — || October 12, 2010 || Mount Lemmon || Mount Lemmon Survey ||  || align=right | 2.6 km || 
|-id=680 bgcolor=#d6d6d6
| 574680 ||  || — || December 5, 2005 || Kitt Peak || Spacewatch ||  || align=right | 3.9 km || 
|-id=681 bgcolor=#d6d6d6
| 574681 ||  || — || June 17, 2009 || Kitt Peak || Spacewatch ||  || align=right | 2.8 km || 
|-id=682 bgcolor=#E9E9E9
| 574682 ||  || — || November 12, 2006 || Mount Lemmon || Mount Lemmon Survey ||  || align=right data-sort-value="0.85" | 850 m || 
|-id=683 bgcolor=#fefefe
| 574683 ||  || — || April 20, 2004 || Kitt Peak || Spacewatch || H || align=right data-sort-value="0.47" | 470 m || 
|-id=684 bgcolor=#d6d6d6
| 574684 ||  || — || October 11, 2010 || Mount Lemmon || Mount Lemmon Survey ||  || align=right | 2.0 km || 
|-id=685 bgcolor=#C2FFFF
| 574685 ||  || — || October 31, 2010 || Kitt Peak || Spacewatch || L4 || align=right | 10 km || 
|-id=686 bgcolor=#d6d6d6
| 574686 ||  || — || October 29, 2010 || Mount Lemmon || Mount Lemmon Survey ||  || align=right | 2.7 km || 
|-id=687 bgcolor=#E9E9E9
| 574687 ||  || — || October 29, 2010 || Kitt Peak || Spacewatch ||  || align=right | 1.5 km || 
|-id=688 bgcolor=#d6d6d6
| 574688 ||  || — || October 29, 2010 || Kitt Peak || Spacewatch ||  || align=right | 2.2 km || 
|-id=689 bgcolor=#fefefe
| 574689 ||  || — || August 27, 2006 || Kitt Peak || Spacewatch ||  || align=right data-sort-value="0.69" | 690 m || 
|-id=690 bgcolor=#fefefe
| 574690 ||  || — || October 2, 2010 || Mount Lemmon || Mount Lemmon Survey ||  || align=right data-sort-value="0.74" | 740 m || 
|-id=691 bgcolor=#fefefe
| 574691 ||  || — || October 31, 2010 || Piszkesteto || Z. Kuli ||  || align=right data-sort-value="0.72" | 720 m || 
|-id=692 bgcolor=#d6d6d6
| 574692 ||  || — || September 4, 2010 || Kitt Peak || Spacewatch ||  || align=right | 2.1 km || 
|-id=693 bgcolor=#fefefe
| 574693 ||  || — || September 27, 2006 || Catalina || CSS ||  || align=right data-sort-value="0.90" | 900 m || 
|-id=694 bgcolor=#d6d6d6
| 574694 ||  || — || December 28, 2005 || Kitt Peak || Spacewatch || 7:4 || align=right | 3.1 km || 
|-id=695 bgcolor=#fefefe
| 574695 ||  || — || February 2, 2008 || Kitt Peak || Spacewatch ||  || align=right data-sort-value="0.95" | 950 m || 
|-id=696 bgcolor=#d6d6d6
| 574696 ||  || — || October 29, 2010 || Mount Lemmon || Mount Lemmon Survey ||  || align=right | 3.3 km || 
|-id=697 bgcolor=#d6d6d6
| 574697 ||  || — || November 10, 2005 || Catalina || CSS ||  || align=right | 4.3 km || 
|-id=698 bgcolor=#E9E9E9
| 574698 ||  || — || January 30, 2003 || Kitt Peak || Spacewatch ||  || align=right | 1.3 km || 
|-id=699 bgcolor=#E9E9E9
| 574699 ||  || — || February 17, 2004 || Kitt Peak || Spacewatch ||  || align=right data-sort-value="0.79" | 790 m || 
|-id=700 bgcolor=#E9E9E9
| 574700 ||  || — || October 28, 2010 || Mount Lemmon || Mount Lemmon Survey ||  || align=right data-sort-value="0.93" | 930 m || 
|}

574701–574800 

|-bgcolor=#fefefe
| 574701 ||  || — || September 3, 2010 || Mount Lemmon || Mount Lemmon Survey || H || align=right data-sort-value="0.52" | 520 m || 
|-id=702 bgcolor=#d6d6d6
| 574702 ||  || — || October 1, 2005 || Mount Lemmon || Mount Lemmon Survey ||  || align=right | 2.0 km || 
|-id=703 bgcolor=#d6d6d6
| 574703 ||  || — || October 28, 2005 || Mount Lemmon || Mount Lemmon Survey ||  || align=right | 3.2 km || 
|-id=704 bgcolor=#fefefe
| 574704 ||  || — || October 17, 2010 || Mount Lemmon || Mount Lemmon Survey ||  || align=right data-sort-value="0.50" | 500 m || 
|-id=705 bgcolor=#fefefe
| 574705 ||  || — || October 17, 2010 || Mount Lemmon || Mount Lemmon Survey ||  || align=right data-sort-value="0.78" | 780 m || 
|-id=706 bgcolor=#d6d6d6
| 574706 ||  || — || October 31, 2010 || Mount Lemmon || Mount Lemmon Survey ||  || align=right | 2.5 km || 
|-id=707 bgcolor=#fefefe
| 574707 ||  || — || October 17, 2010 || Mount Lemmon || Mount Lemmon Survey ||  || align=right data-sort-value="0.49" | 490 m || 
|-id=708 bgcolor=#d6d6d6
| 574708 ||  || — || March 12, 2013 || Mount Lemmon || Mount Lemmon Survey || 7:4 || align=right | 2.8 km || 
|-id=709 bgcolor=#d6d6d6
| 574709 ||  || — || October 31, 2010 || Kitt Peak || Spacewatch ||  || align=right | 2.5 km || 
|-id=710 bgcolor=#d6d6d6
| 574710 ||  || — || October 17, 2010 || Mount Lemmon || Mount Lemmon Survey || 7:4 || align=right | 3.5 km || 
|-id=711 bgcolor=#d6d6d6
| 574711 ||  || — || October 19, 2010 || Mount Lemmon || Mount Lemmon Survey ||  || align=right | 2.9 km || 
|-id=712 bgcolor=#d6d6d6
| 574712 ||  || — || October 29, 2010 || Mount Lemmon || Mount Lemmon Survey ||  || align=right | 2.2 km || 
|-id=713 bgcolor=#fefefe
| 574713 ||  || — || October 31, 2010 || Mount Lemmon || Mount Lemmon Survey ||  || align=right data-sort-value="0.64" | 640 m || 
|-id=714 bgcolor=#C2FFFF
| 574714 ||  || — || October 29, 2010 || Mount Lemmon || Mount Lemmon Survey || L4 || align=right | 7.7 km || 
|-id=715 bgcolor=#fefefe
| 574715 ||  || — || November 1, 2010 || Mount Lemmon || Mount Lemmon Survey ||  || align=right data-sort-value="0.74" | 740 m || 
|-id=716 bgcolor=#E9E9E9
| 574716 ||  || — || November 1, 2010 || Mount Lemmon || Mount Lemmon Survey ||  || align=right | 1.3 km || 
|-id=717 bgcolor=#fefefe
| 574717 ||  || — || August 16, 2006 || Palomar || NEAT ||  || align=right data-sort-value="0.88" | 880 m || 
|-id=718 bgcolor=#E9E9E9
| 574718 ||  || — || November 2, 2010 || Kitt Peak || Spacewatch ||  || align=right data-sort-value="0.79" | 790 m || 
|-id=719 bgcolor=#fefefe
| 574719 ||  || — || November 2, 2010 || Mount Lemmon || Mount Lemmon Survey ||  || align=right data-sort-value="0.68" | 680 m || 
|-id=720 bgcolor=#fefefe
| 574720 ||  || — || January 18, 2008 || Kitt Peak || Spacewatch ||  || align=right data-sort-value="0.79" | 790 m || 
|-id=721 bgcolor=#d6d6d6
| 574721 ||  || — || October 23, 2005 || Catalina || CSS ||  || align=right | 2.8 km || 
|-id=722 bgcolor=#E9E9E9
| 574722 ||  || — || November 2, 2010 || Kitt Peak || Spacewatch ||  || align=right | 1.1 km || 
|-id=723 bgcolor=#E9E9E9
| 574723 ||  || — || November 4, 2010 || Les Engarouines || L. Bernasconi ||  || align=right | 1.8 km || 
|-id=724 bgcolor=#E9E9E9
| 574724 ||  || — || November 20, 2006 || Mount Lemmon || Mount Lemmon Survey ||  || align=right data-sort-value="0.81" | 810 m || 
|-id=725 bgcolor=#fefefe
| 574725 ||  || — || December 31, 2007 || Kitt Peak || Spacewatch ||  || align=right data-sort-value="0.80" | 800 m || 
|-id=726 bgcolor=#d6d6d6
| 574726 ||  || — || November 4, 2010 || Mount Lemmon || Mount Lemmon Survey ||  || align=right | 3.5 km || 
|-id=727 bgcolor=#fefefe
| 574727 ||  || — || September 17, 2010 || Catalina || CSS ||  || align=right data-sort-value="0.95" | 950 m || 
|-id=728 bgcolor=#fefefe
| 574728 ||  || — || March 11, 2005 || Kitt Peak || Spacewatch ||  || align=right data-sort-value="0.85" | 850 m || 
|-id=729 bgcolor=#fefefe
| 574729 ||  || — || November 3, 2010 || Mount Lemmon || Mount Lemmon Survey ||  || align=right data-sort-value="0.83" | 830 m || 
|-id=730 bgcolor=#fefefe
| 574730 ||  || — || September 18, 2006 || Kitt Peak || Spacewatch ||  || align=right data-sort-value="0.61" | 610 m || 
|-id=731 bgcolor=#E9E9E9
| 574731 ||  || — || October 29, 2010 || Kitt Peak || Spacewatch ||  || align=right | 1.0 km || 
|-id=732 bgcolor=#d6d6d6
| 574732 ||  || — || April 5, 2008 || Flagstaff || L. H. Wasserman ||  || align=right | 2.8 km || 
|-id=733 bgcolor=#fefefe
| 574733 ||  || — || October 31, 2010 || Kitt Peak || Spacewatch ||  || align=right data-sort-value="0.92" | 920 m || 
|-id=734 bgcolor=#fefefe
| 574734 ||  || — || October 14, 2010 || Mount Lemmon || Mount Lemmon Survey ||  || align=right data-sort-value="0.73" | 730 m || 
|-id=735 bgcolor=#E9E9E9
| 574735 ||  || — || January 16, 2007 || Catalina || CSS ||  || align=right | 1.5 km || 
|-id=736 bgcolor=#fefefe
| 574736 ||  || — || November 6, 2010 || Kitt Peak || Spacewatch || H || align=right data-sort-value="0.52" | 520 m || 
|-id=737 bgcolor=#fefefe
| 574737 ||  || — || November 6, 2010 || Mount Lemmon || Mount Lemmon Survey ||  || align=right data-sort-value="0.58" | 580 m || 
|-id=738 bgcolor=#E9E9E9
| 574738 ||  || — || November 8, 2010 || Kitt Peak || Spacewatch ||  || align=right | 1.2 km || 
|-id=739 bgcolor=#fefefe
| 574739 ||  || — || July 21, 2006 || Mount Lemmon || Mount Lemmon Survey ||  || align=right data-sort-value="0.80" | 800 m || 
|-id=740 bgcolor=#d6d6d6
| 574740 ||  || — || November 10, 2010 || Mount Lemmon || Mount Lemmon Survey || 7:4 || align=right | 2.5 km || 
|-id=741 bgcolor=#d6d6d6
| 574741 ||  || — || November 10, 2010 || Kitt Peak || Spacewatch ||  || align=right | 2.3 km || 
|-id=742 bgcolor=#E9E9E9
| 574742 ||  || — || November 10, 2010 || Zelenchukskaya Stn || T. V. Kryachko, B. Satovski ||  || align=right | 1.1 km || 
|-id=743 bgcolor=#fefefe
| 574743 ||  || — || November 11, 2010 || Mount Lemmon || Mount Lemmon Survey ||  || align=right | 1.0 km || 
|-id=744 bgcolor=#fefefe
| 574744 ||  || — || November 7, 2010 || Mount Lemmon || Mount Lemmon Survey ||  || align=right data-sort-value="0.63" | 630 m || 
|-id=745 bgcolor=#E9E9E9
| 574745 ||  || — || November 8, 2010 || Mauna Kea || P. Forshay, M. Micheli ||  || align=right data-sort-value="0.75" | 750 m || 
|-id=746 bgcolor=#fefefe
| 574746 ||  || — || June 17, 2004 || Palomar || NEAT || H || align=right | 1.1 km || 
|-id=747 bgcolor=#d6d6d6
| 574747 ||  || — || September 11, 2004 || Socorro || LINEAR ||  || align=right | 2.7 km || 
|-id=748 bgcolor=#fefefe
| 574748 ||  || — || November 10, 2010 || Kitt Peak || Spacewatch ||  || align=right data-sort-value="0.64" | 640 m || 
|-id=749 bgcolor=#fefefe
| 574749 ||  || — || November 13, 2010 || Mount Lemmon || Mount Lemmon Survey ||  || align=right data-sort-value="0.59" | 590 m || 
|-id=750 bgcolor=#d6d6d6
| 574750 ||  || — || November 5, 2004 || Palomar || NEAT || Tj (2.99) || align=right | 4.5 km || 
|-id=751 bgcolor=#C2FFFF
| 574751 ||  || — || November 30, 2011 || Kitt Peak || Spacewatch || L4 || align=right | 8.7 km || 
|-id=752 bgcolor=#E9E9E9
| 574752 ||  || — || January 25, 2012 || Haleakala || Pan-STARRS ||  || align=right | 1.1 km || 
|-id=753 bgcolor=#d6d6d6
| 574753 ||  || — || October 30, 2005 || Mount Lemmon || Mount Lemmon Survey ||  || align=right | 3.6 km || 
|-id=754 bgcolor=#E9E9E9
| 574754 ||  || — || November 2, 2010 || Mount Lemmon || Mount Lemmon Survey ||  || align=right | 1.6 km || 
|-id=755 bgcolor=#d6d6d6
| 574755 ||  || — || December 29, 2011 || Kitt Peak || Spacewatch ||  || align=right | 3.2 km || 
|-id=756 bgcolor=#E9E9E9
| 574756 ||  || — || February 1, 2012 || Mount Lemmon || Mount Lemmon Survey ||  || align=right | 1.1 km || 
|-id=757 bgcolor=#fefefe
| 574757 ||  || — || November 1, 2010 || Palomar || PTF ||  || align=right data-sort-value="0.78" | 780 m || 
|-id=758 bgcolor=#d6d6d6
| 574758 ||  || — || April 20, 2012 || Mount Lemmon || Mount Lemmon Survey ||  || align=right | 2.6 km || 
|-id=759 bgcolor=#E9E9E9
| 574759 ||  || — || November 5, 2010 || Mount Lemmon || Mount Lemmon Survey ||  || align=right | 1.1 km || 
|-id=760 bgcolor=#d6d6d6
| 574760 ||  || — || November 2, 2010 || Kitt Peak || Spacewatch ||  || align=right | 3.2 km || 
|-id=761 bgcolor=#C2FFFF
| 574761 ||  || — || November 24, 1998 || Kitt Peak || Spacewatch || L4 || align=right | 7.3 km || 
|-id=762 bgcolor=#d6d6d6
| 574762 ||  || — || November 1, 2010 || Mount Lemmon || Mount Lemmon Survey || 7:4 || align=right | 3.2 km || 
|-id=763 bgcolor=#E9E9E9
| 574763 ||  || — || November 2, 2010 || Mount Lemmon || Mount Lemmon Survey ||  || align=right data-sort-value="0.72" | 720 m || 
|-id=764 bgcolor=#C2FFFF
| 574764 ||  || — || November 2, 2010 || Mount Lemmon || Mount Lemmon Survey || L4 || align=right | 8.0 km || 
|-id=765 bgcolor=#E9E9E9
| 574765 ||  || — || November 5, 2010 || Mount Lemmon || Mount Lemmon Survey ||  || align=right data-sort-value="0.89" | 890 m || 
|-id=766 bgcolor=#d6d6d6
| 574766 ||  || — || November 3, 2010 || Mount Lemmon || Mount Lemmon Survey || 7:4 || align=right | 2.9 km || 
|-id=767 bgcolor=#d6d6d6
| 574767 ||  || — || November 3, 2010 || Kitt Peak || Spacewatch ||  || align=right | 2.6 km || 
|-id=768 bgcolor=#d6d6d6
| 574768 ||  || — || November 4, 2010 || Mount Lemmon || Mount Lemmon Survey ||  || align=right | 2.5 km || 
|-id=769 bgcolor=#fefefe
| 574769 ||  || — || November 8, 2010 || Kitt Peak || Spacewatch || H || align=right data-sort-value="0.46" | 460 m || 
|-id=770 bgcolor=#C2FFFF
| 574770 ||  || — || November 8, 2010 || Kitt Peak || Spacewatch || L4 || align=right | 9.0 km || 
|-id=771 bgcolor=#d6d6d6
| 574771 ||  || — || November 10, 2010 || Mount Lemmon || Mount Lemmon Survey ||  || align=right | 2.8 km || 
|-id=772 bgcolor=#fefefe
| 574772 ||  || — || November 6, 2010 || Mount Lemmon || Mount Lemmon Survey || H || align=right data-sort-value="0.54" | 540 m || 
|-id=773 bgcolor=#C2FFFF
| 574773 ||  || — || November 14, 2010 || Mount Lemmon || Mount Lemmon Survey || L4 || align=right | 7.7 km || 
|-id=774 bgcolor=#fefefe
| 574774 ||  || — || November 27, 2010 || Mount Lemmon || Mount Lemmon Survey ||  || align=right data-sort-value="0.66" | 660 m || 
|-id=775 bgcolor=#E9E9E9
| 574775 ||  || — || November 26, 2010 || Mount Lemmon || Mount Lemmon Survey ||  || align=right | 1.3 km || 
|-id=776 bgcolor=#E9E9E9
| 574776 ||  || — || November 27, 2010 || Mount Lemmon || Mount Lemmon Survey ||  || align=right | 1.6 km || 
|-id=777 bgcolor=#E9E9E9
| 574777 ||  || — || November 27, 2010 || Mount Lemmon || Mount Lemmon Survey ||  || align=right | 1.00 km || 
|-id=778 bgcolor=#fefefe
| 574778 ||  || — || October 30, 2010 || Kitt Peak || Spacewatch ||  || align=right data-sort-value="0.66" | 660 m || 
|-id=779 bgcolor=#E9E9E9
| 574779 ||  || — || April 1, 2008 || Kitt Peak || Spacewatch ||  || align=right data-sort-value="0.87" | 870 m || 
|-id=780 bgcolor=#E9E9E9
| 574780 ||  || — || November 13, 2010 || Kitt Peak || Spacewatch ||  || align=right data-sort-value="0.83" | 830 m || 
|-id=781 bgcolor=#d6d6d6
| 574781 ||  || — || November 27, 2010 || Mount Lemmon || Mount Lemmon Survey ||  || align=right | 2.7 km || 
|-id=782 bgcolor=#E9E9E9
| 574782 ||  || — || November 5, 2010 || Mayhill-ISON || L. Elenin ||  || align=right | 1.5 km || 
|-id=783 bgcolor=#E9E9E9
| 574783 ||  || — || October 14, 2010 || Mount Lemmon || Mount Lemmon Survey ||  || align=right data-sort-value="0.98" | 980 m || 
|-id=784 bgcolor=#fefefe
| 574784 ||  || — || October 29, 2010 || Catalina || CSS ||  || align=right data-sort-value="0.80" | 800 m || 
|-id=785 bgcolor=#C2FFFF
| 574785 ||  || — || September 3, 2008 || Kitt Peak || Spacewatch || L4 || align=right | 6.0 km || 
|-id=786 bgcolor=#E9E9E9
| 574786 ||  || — || November 3, 2010 || Kitt Peak || Spacewatch ||  || align=right | 1.5 km || 
|-id=787 bgcolor=#fefefe
| 574787 ||  || — || February 29, 2004 || Kitt Peak || Spacewatch ||  || align=right data-sort-value="0.90" | 900 m || 
|-id=788 bgcolor=#d6d6d6
| 574788 ||  || — || December 9, 2010 || Catalina || CSS ||  || align=right | 4.6 km || 
|-id=789 bgcolor=#E9E9E9
| 574789 ||  || — || November 16, 2010 || Mount Lemmon || Mount Lemmon Survey ||  || align=right | 1.8 km || 
|-id=790 bgcolor=#d6d6d6
| 574790 ||  || — || June 24, 2014 || Haleakala || Pan-STARRS || 7:4 || align=right | 3.7 km || 
|-id=791 bgcolor=#d6d6d6
| 574791 ||  || — || November 26, 2010 || Mount Lemmon || Mount Lemmon Survey ||  || align=right | 2.8 km || 
|-id=792 bgcolor=#E9E9E9
| 574792 ||  || — || December 1, 2010 || Mount Lemmon || Mount Lemmon Survey || BAR || align=right | 1.5 km || 
|-id=793 bgcolor=#d6d6d6
| 574793 ||  || — || December 1, 2010 || Mount Lemmon || Mount Lemmon Survey ||  || align=right | 2.7 km || 
|-id=794 bgcolor=#E9E9E9
| 574794 ||  || — || December 2, 2010 || Vitebsk || V. Nevski ||  || align=right | 1.3 km || 
|-id=795 bgcolor=#E9E9E9
| 574795 ||  || — || November 18, 2006 || Mount Lemmon || Mount Lemmon Survey ||  || align=right | 1.4 km || 
|-id=796 bgcolor=#d6d6d6
| 574796 ||  || — || December 2, 2010 || Mount Lemmon || Mount Lemmon Survey || 7:4 || align=right | 2.5 km || 
|-id=797 bgcolor=#d6d6d6
| 574797 ||  || — || December 1, 2010 || Mount Lemmon || Mount Lemmon Survey ||  || align=right | 2.8 km || 
|-id=798 bgcolor=#E9E9E9
| 574798 ||  || — || December 2, 2010 || Kitt Peak || Spacewatch ||  || align=right data-sort-value="0.73" | 730 m || 
|-id=799 bgcolor=#E9E9E9
| 574799 ||  || — || November 12, 2010 || Mount Lemmon || Mount Lemmon Survey ||  || align=right | 1.5 km || 
|-id=800 bgcolor=#E9E9E9
| 574800 ||  || — || December 1, 2010 || Mount Lemmon || Mount Lemmon Survey ||  || align=right data-sort-value="0.69" | 690 m || 
|}

574801–574900 

|-bgcolor=#E9E9E9
| 574801 ||  || — || June 22, 2004 || Kitt Peak || Spacewatch ||  || align=right | 2.1 km || 
|-id=802 bgcolor=#E9E9E9
| 574802 ||  || — || November 27, 2006 || Mount Lemmon || Mount Lemmon Survey ||  || align=right data-sort-value="0.85" | 850 m || 
|-id=803 bgcolor=#E9E9E9
| 574803 ||  || — || December 21, 2006 || Kitt Peak || Spacewatch ||  || align=right | 1.1 km || 
|-id=804 bgcolor=#E9E9E9
| 574804 ||  || — || December 3, 2010 || Mount Lemmon || Mount Lemmon Survey ||  || align=right | 1.4 km || 
|-id=805 bgcolor=#E9E9E9
| 574805 ||  || — || December 4, 2010 || Mount Lemmon || Mount Lemmon Survey ||  || align=right data-sort-value="0.98" | 980 m || 
|-id=806 bgcolor=#d6d6d6
| 574806 ||  || — || December 9, 2010 || Mount Lemmon || Mount Lemmon Survey ||  || align=right | 2.6 km || 
|-id=807 bgcolor=#fefefe
| 574807 ||  || — || October 19, 2006 || Catalina || CSS ||  || align=right data-sort-value="0.80" | 800 m || 
|-id=808 bgcolor=#E9E9E9
| 574808 ||  || — || November 27, 2010 || Mount Lemmon || Mount Lemmon Survey ||  || align=right | 1.5 km || 
|-id=809 bgcolor=#fefefe
| 574809 ||  || — || December 10, 2010 || Mount Lemmon || Mount Lemmon Survey || H || align=right data-sort-value="0.75" | 750 m || 
|-id=810 bgcolor=#E9E9E9
| 574810 ||  || — || December 5, 2010 || Mount Lemmon || Mount Lemmon Survey ||  || align=right | 1.4 km || 
|-id=811 bgcolor=#d6d6d6
| 574811 ||  || — || October 12, 2004 || Anderson Mesa || LONEOS ||  || align=right | 3.5 km || 
|-id=812 bgcolor=#fefefe
| 574812 ||  || — || October 11, 2006 || Palomar || NEAT ||  || align=right data-sort-value="0.76" | 760 m || 
|-id=813 bgcolor=#E9E9E9
| 574813 ||  || — || December 1, 2006 || Mount Lemmon || Mount Lemmon Survey ||  || align=right | 1.6 km || 
|-id=814 bgcolor=#E9E9E9
| 574814 ||  || — || December 2, 2010 || Mount Lemmon || Mount Lemmon Survey ||  || align=right data-sort-value="0.96" | 960 m || 
|-id=815 bgcolor=#E9E9E9
| 574815 ||  || — || October 15, 2001 || Palomar || NEAT ||  || align=right | 1.3 km || 
|-id=816 bgcolor=#E9E9E9
| 574816 ||  || — || February 21, 2007 || Bergisch Gladbach || W. Bickel ||  || align=right | 1.4 km || 
|-id=817 bgcolor=#E9E9E9
| 574817 ||  || — || December 8, 2010 || Mount Lemmon || Mount Lemmon Survey ||  || align=right | 1.1 km || 
|-id=818 bgcolor=#E9E9E9
| 574818 ||  || — || December 14, 2010 || Mount Lemmon || Mount Lemmon Survey ||  || align=right | 1.4 km || 
|-id=819 bgcolor=#E9E9E9
| 574819 ||  || — || November 22, 2014 || Haleakala || Pan-STARRS ||  || align=right | 1.1 km || 
|-id=820 bgcolor=#d6d6d6
| 574820 ||  || — || December 13, 2010 || Mount Lemmon || Mount Lemmon Survey ||  || align=right | 2.5 km || 
|-id=821 bgcolor=#d6d6d6
| 574821 ||  || — || March 16, 2012 || Haleakala || Pan-STARRS || 3:2 || align=right | 3.4 km || 
|-id=822 bgcolor=#d6d6d6
| 574822 ||  || — || April 12, 2013 || Mount Graham || R. P. Boyle ||  || align=right | 3.1 km || 
|-id=823 bgcolor=#d6d6d6
| 574823 ||  || — || November 6, 2016 || Mount Lemmon || Mount Lemmon Survey || Tj (2.99) || align=right | 4.1 km || 
|-id=824 bgcolor=#E9E9E9
| 574824 ||  || — || December 10, 2010 || Mount Lemmon || Mount Lemmon Survey ||  || align=right data-sort-value="0.79" | 790 m || 
|-id=825 bgcolor=#d6d6d6
| 574825 ||  || — || January 2, 2012 || Mount Lemmon || Mount Lemmon Survey || 3:2 || align=right | 3.5 km || 
|-id=826 bgcolor=#E9E9E9
| 574826 ||  || — || January 4, 2016 || Haleakala || Pan-STARRS ||  || align=right | 1.5 km || 
|-id=827 bgcolor=#E9E9E9
| 574827 ||  || — || December 10, 2014 || Mount Lemmon || Mount Lemmon Survey ||  || align=right | 1.6 km || 
|-id=828 bgcolor=#E9E9E9
| 574828 ||  || — || December 14, 2010 || Mount Lemmon || Mount Lemmon Survey ||  || align=right | 1.3 km || 
|-id=829 bgcolor=#E9E9E9
| 574829 ||  || — || December 6, 2010 || Mount Lemmon || Mount Lemmon Survey ||  || align=right | 1.1 km || 
|-id=830 bgcolor=#E9E9E9
| 574830 ||  || — || December 2, 2010 || Mount Lemmon || Mount Lemmon Survey ||  || align=right | 1.00 km || 
|-id=831 bgcolor=#C2FFFF
| 574831 ||  || — || December 13, 2010 || Mount Lemmon || Mount Lemmon Survey || L4 || align=right | 6.9 km || 
|-id=832 bgcolor=#C2FFFF
| 574832 ||  || — || December 3, 2010 || Mount Lemmon || Mount Lemmon Survey || L4 || align=right | 6.7 km || 
|-id=833 bgcolor=#E9E9E9
| 574833 ||  || — || December 8, 2010 || Mount Lemmon || Mount Lemmon Survey ||  || align=right | 1.3 km || 
|-id=834 bgcolor=#E9E9E9
| 574834 ||  || — || December 30, 2010 || Piszkesteto || Z. Kuli, K. Sárneczky ||  || align=right | 1.0 km || 
|-id=835 bgcolor=#E9E9E9
| 574835 ||  || — || December 25, 2010 || Mount Lemmon || Mount Lemmon Survey ||  || align=right | 1.3 km || 
|-id=836 bgcolor=#E9E9E9
| 574836 ||  || — || December 25, 2010 || Mount Lemmon || Mount Lemmon Survey ||  || align=right | 1.2 km || 
|-id=837 bgcolor=#E9E9E9
| 574837 ||  || — || December 14, 2010 || Mount Lemmon || Mount Lemmon Survey ||  || align=right | 1.5 km || 
|-id=838 bgcolor=#fefefe
| 574838 ||  || — || January 3, 2011 || Mount Lemmon || Mount Lemmon Survey ||  || align=right data-sort-value="0.62" | 620 m || 
|-id=839 bgcolor=#E9E9E9
| 574839 ||  || — || March 13, 2007 || Catalina || CSS ||  || align=right | 1.5 km || 
|-id=840 bgcolor=#E9E9E9
| 574840 ||  || — || January 2, 2011 || Mount Lemmon || Mount Lemmon Survey ||  || align=right | 2.3 km || 
|-id=841 bgcolor=#E9E9E9
| 574841 ||  || — || March 9, 2003 || Anderson Mesa || LONEOS ||  || align=right | 2.1 km || 
|-id=842 bgcolor=#E9E9E9
| 574842 ||  || — || June 20, 2003 || Palomar || NEAT ||  || align=right | 2.6 km || 
|-id=843 bgcolor=#fefefe
| 574843 ||  || — || November 25, 2006 || Kitt Peak || Spacewatch ||  || align=right data-sort-value="0.80" | 800 m || 
|-id=844 bgcolor=#E9E9E9
| 574844 ||  || — || January 10, 2011 || Mount Lemmon || Mount Lemmon Survey ||  || align=right | 1.5 km || 
|-id=845 bgcolor=#E9E9E9
| 574845 ||  || — || July 17, 2004 || Cerro Tololo || Cerro Tololo Obs. ||  || align=right data-sort-value="0.91" | 910 m || 
|-id=846 bgcolor=#E9E9E9
| 574846 ||  || — || January 10, 2011 || Mount Lemmon || Mount Lemmon Survey ||  || align=right | 1.4 km || 
|-id=847 bgcolor=#fefefe
| 574847 ||  || — || September 18, 2006 || Kitt Peak || Spacewatch ||  || align=right data-sort-value="0.47" | 470 m || 
|-id=848 bgcolor=#fefefe
| 574848 ||  || — || January 9, 2007 || Palomar || NEAT ||  || align=right | 1.2 km || 
|-id=849 bgcolor=#E9E9E9
| 574849 ||  || — || March 25, 2007 || Mount Lemmon || Mount Lemmon Survey ||  || align=right | 1.4 km || 
|-id=850 bgcolor=#E9E9E9
| 574850 ||  || — || November 15, 2010 || Mount Lemmon || Mount Lemmon Survey ||  || align=right | 1.4 km || 
|-id=851 bgcolor=#E9E9E9
| 574851 ||  || — || December 9, 2010 || Mount Lemmon || Mount Lemmon Survey ||  || align=right | 1.3 km || 
|-id=852 bgcolor=#E9E9E9
| 574852 ||  || — || December 14, 2010 || Mount Lemmon || Mount Lemmon Survey ||  || align=right | 1.5 km || 
|-id=853 bgcolor=#d6d6d6
| 574853 ||  || — || December 10, 2010 || Mount Lemmon || Mount Lemmon Survey ||  || align=right | 2.4 km || 
|-id=854 bgcolor=#fefefe
| 574854 ||  || — || January 12, 2008 || Kitt Peak || Spacewatch ||  || align=right data-sort-value="0.58" | 580 m || 
|-id=855 bgcolor=#E9E9E9
| 574855 ||  || — || January 14, 2011 || Mount Lemmon || Mount Lemmon Survey ||  || align=right data-sort-value="0.89" | 890 m || 
|-id=856 bgcolor=#E9E9E9
| 574856 ||  || — || January 14, 2011 || Mount Lemmon || Mount Lemmon Survey ||  || align=right | 1.6 km || 
|-id=857 bgcolor=#E9E9E9
| 574857 ||  || — || January 5, 2011 || Mount Lemmon || Mount Lemmon Survey ||  || align=right data-sort-value="0.81" | 810 m || 
|-id=858 bgcolor=#E9E9E9
| 574858 ||  || — || December 14, 2010 || Mount Lemmon || Mount Lemmon Survey ||  || align=right | 1.1 km || 
|-id=859 bgcolor=#E9E9E9
| 574859 ||  || — || January 12, 2011 || Mount Lemmon || Mount Lemmon Survey ||  || align=right data-sort-value="0.81" | 810 m || 
|-id=860 bgcolor=#E9E9E9
| 574860 ||  || — || January 4, 2011 || Mount Lemmon || Mount Lemmon Survey ||  || align=right | 1.4 km || 
|-id=861 bgcolor=#E9E9E9
| 574861 ||  || — || January 8, 2011 || Mount Lemmon || Mount Lemmon Survey ||  || align=right data-sort-value="0.97" | 970 m || 
|-id=862 bgcolor=#fefefe
| 574862 ||  || — || December 21, 2014 || Haleakala || Pan-STARRS ||  || align=right data-sort-value="0.71" | 710 m || 
|-id=863 bgcolor=#E9E9E9
| 574863 ||  || — || January 13, 2011 || Mount Lemmon || Mount Lemmon Survey ||  || align=right data-sort-value="0.68" | 680 m || 
|-id=864 bgcolor=#E9E9E9
| 574864 ||  || — || January 9, 2011 || Mount Lemmon || Mount Lemmon Survey ||  || align=right data-sort-value="0.87" | 870 m || 
|-id=865 bgcolor=#E9E9E9
| 574865 ||  || — || January 14, 2011 || Mount Lemmon || Mount Lemmon Survey ||  || align=right data-sort-value="0.92" | 920 m || 
|-id=866 bgcolor=#d6d6d6
| 574866 ||  || — || January 7, 2016 || Haleakala || Pan-STARRS ||  || align=right | 2.3 km || 
|-id=867 bgcolor=#d6d6d6
| 574867 ||  || — || January 14, 2011 || Mount Lemmon || Mount Lemmon Survey ||  || align=right | 1.8 km || 
|-id=868 bgcolor=#E9E9E9
| 574868 ||  || — || August 25, 2014 || Haleakala || Pan-STARRS ||  || align=right | 1.6 km || 
|-id=869 bgcolor=#E9E9E9
| 574869 ||  || — || January 15, 2011 || Mount Lemmon || Mount Lemmon Survey ||  || align=right | 1.2 km || 
|-id=870 bgcolor=#E9E9E9
| 574870 ||  || — || January 12, 2011 || Kitt Peak || Spacewatch ||  || align=right | 1.1 km || 
|-id=871 bgcolor=#E9E9E9
| 574871 ||  || — || February 17, 2007 || Mount Lemmon || Mount Lemmon Survey ||  || align=right | 1.9 km || 
|-id=872 bgcolor=#E9E9E9
| 574872 ||  || — || December 21, 2006 || Kitt Peak || L. H. Wasserman ||  || align=right data-sort-value="0.82" | 820 m || 
|-id=873 bgcolor=#C2FFFF
| 574873 ||  || — || November 6, 2010 || Kitt Peak || Spacewatch || L4 || align=right | 10 km || 
|-id=874 bgcolor=#d6d6d6
| 574874 ||  || — || January 25, 2011 || Kitt Peak || Spacewatch ||  || align=right | 2.5 km || 
|-id=875 bgcolor=#E9E9E9
| 574875 ||  || — || January 9, 2011 || Mount Lemmon || Mount Lemmon Survey ||  || align=right | 1.2 km || 
|-id=876 bgcolor=#fefefe
| 574876 ||  || — || November 23, 2006 || Mount Lemmon || Mount Lemmon Survey ||  || align=right data-sort-value="0.71" | 710 m || 
|-id=877 bgcolor=#E9E9E9
| 574877 ||  || — || January 31, 2011 || Piszkesteto || Z. Kuli, K. Sárneczky ||  || align=right data-sort-value="0.64" | 640 m || 
|-id=878 bgcolor=#E9E9E9
| 574878 ||  || — || January 31, 2011 || Piszkesteto || Z. Kuli, K. Sárneczky ||  || align=right | 2.3 km || 
|-id=879 bgcolor=#E9E9E9
| 574879 ||  || — || September 21, 2000 || Kitt Peak || R. Millis, R. M. Wagner ||  || align=right | 2.0 km || 
|-id=880 bgcolor=#E9E9E9
| 574880 ||  || — || January 31, 2011 || Piszkesteto || Z. Kuli, K. Sárneczky ||  || align=right | 1.0 km || 
|-id=881 bgcolor=#E9E9E9
| 574881 ||  || — || January 13, 2002 || Kitt Peak || Spacewatch ||  || align=right | 1.4 km || 
|-id=882 bgcolor=#E9E9E9
| 574882 ||  || — || January 30, 2011 || Mount Lemmon || Mount Lemmon Survey ||  || align=right | 2.0 km || 
|-id=883 bgcolor=#E9E9E9
| 574883 ||  || — || February 21, 2003 || Palomar || NEAT ||  || align=right | 1.2 km || 
|-id=884 bgcolor=#E9E9E9
| 574884 ||  || — || April 24, 2003 || Kitt Peak || Spacewatch ||  || align=right | 1.6 km || 
|-id=885 bgcolor=#E9E9E9
| 574885 ||  || — || January 30, 2011 || Haleakala || Pan-STARRS ||  || align=right data-sort-value="0.91" | 910 m || 
|-id=886 bgcolor=#d6d6d6
| 574886 ||  || — || October 10, 2010 || Mount Lemmon || Mount Lemmon Survey ||  || align=right | 4.1 km || 
|-id=887 bgcolor=#d6d6d6
| 574887 ||  || — || February 26, 2007 || Mount Lemmon || Mount Lemmon Survey ||  || align=right | 3.1 km || 
|-id=888 bgcolor=#FA8072
| 574888 ||  || — || January 18, 2004 || Palomar || NEAT ||  || align=right data-sort-value="0.44" | 440 m || 
|-id=889 bgcolor=#E9E9E9
| 574889 ||  || — || October 15, 2001 || Palomar || NEAT ||  || align=right | 1.0 km || 
|-id=890 bgcolor=#E9E9E9
| 574890 ||  || — || January 27, 2011 || Mount Lemmon || Mount Lemmon Survey ||  || align=right | 1.4 km || 
|-id=891 bgcolor=#E9E9E9
| 574891 ||  || — || December 5, 2010 || Mount Lemmon || Mount Lemmon Survey ||  || align=right | 1.3 km || 
|-id=892 bgcolor=#E9E9E9
| 574892 ||  || — || February 12, 2011 || Mount Lemmon || Mount Lemmon Survey ||  || align=right | 1.3 km || 
|-id=893 bgcolor=#E9E9E9
| 574893 ||  || — || October 24, 2009 || Kitt Peak || Spacewatch ||  || align=right | 1.7 km || 
|-id=894 bgcolor=#E9E9E9
| 574894 ||  || — || November 12, 2005 || Kitt Peak || Spacewatch ||  || align=right | 2.2 km || 
|-id=895 bgcolor=#E9E9E9
| 574895 ||  || — || January 14, 2011 || Kitt Peak || Spacewatch || EUN || align=right | 1.1 km || 
|-id=896 bgcolor=#E9E9E9
| 574896 ||  || — || March 23, 2003 || Apache Point || SDSS Collaboration ||  || align=right | 1.6 km || 
|-id=897 bgcolor=#E9E9E9
| 574897 ||  || — || September 21, 2009 || Kitt Peak || Spacewatch ||  || align=right | 1.4 km || 
|-id=898 bgcolor=#d6d6d6
| 574898 ||  || — || October 21, 2003 || Kitt Peak || Spacewatch ||  || align=right | 3.3 km || 
|-id=899 bgcolor=#d6d6d6
| 574899 ||  || — || January 29, 2011 || Kitt Peak || Spacewatch ||  || align=right | 3.1 km || 
|-id=900 bgcolor=#d6d6d6
| 574900 ||  || — || January 29, 2011 || Mount Lemmon || Mount Lemmon Survey ||  || align=right | 2.9 km || 
|}

574901–575000 

|-bgcolor=#E9E9E9
| 574901 ||  || — || September 29, 2009 || Kitt Peak || Spacewatch ||  || align=right | 1.8 km || 
|-id=902 bgcolor=#fefefe
| 574902 ||  || — || December 19, 2003 || Kitt Peak || Spacewatch ||  || align=right data-sort-value="0.83" | 830 m || 
|-id=903 bgcolor=#E9E9E9
| 574903 ||  || — || January 14, 2011 || Kitt Peak || Spacewatch ||  || align=right data-sort-value="0.94" | 940 m || 
|-id=904 bgcolor=#E9E9E9
| 574904 ||  || — || December 27, 2006 || Mount Lemmon || Mount Lemmon Survey ||  || align=right data-sort-value="0.96" | 960 m || 
|-id=905 bgcolor=#E9E9E9
| 574905 ||  || — || December 21, 2006 || Kitt Peak || L. H. Wasserman ||  || align=right data-sort-value="0.86" | 860 m || 
|-id=906 bgcolor=#d6d6d6
| 574906 ||  || — || October 18, 2009 || Mount Lemmon || Mount Lemmon Survey ||  || align=right | 1.9 km || 
|-id=907 bgcolor=#E9E9E9
| 574907 ||  || — || September 17, 2009 || Kitt Peak || Spacewatch ||  || align=right | 1.7 km || 
|-id=908 bgcolor=#E9E9E9
| 574908 ||  || — || February 8, 2011 || Mount Lemmon || Mount Lemmon Survey ||  || align=right | 1.1 km || 
|-id=909 bgcolor=#E9E9E9
| 574909 ||  || — || February 5, 2011 || Haleakala || Pan-STARRS ||  || align=right data-sort-value="0.79" | 790 m || 
|-id=910 bgcolor=#d6d6d6
| 574910 ||  || — || January 27, 2011 || Kitt Peak || Spacewatch || Tj (2.99) || align=right | 2.7 km || 
|-id=911 bgcolor=#E9E9E9
| 574911 ||  || — || February 7, 2011 || Mount Lemmon || Mount Lemmon Survey ||  || align=right | 1.5 km || 
|-id=912 bgcolor=#E9E9E9
| 574912 ||  || — || January 18, 2015 || Haleakala || Pan-STARRS ||  || align=right data-sort-value="0.96" | 960 m || 
|-id=913 bgcolor=#E9E9E9
| 574913 ||  || — || February 5, 2011 || Haleakala || Pan-STARRS ||  || align=right | 1.6 km || 
|-id=914 bgcolor=#E9E9E9
| 574914 ||  || — || January 24, 2015 || Haleakala || Pan-STARRS ||  || align=right data-sort-value="0.99" | 990 m || 
|-id=915 bgcolor=#fefefe
| 574915 ||  || — || January 28, 2015 || Haleakala || Pan-STARRS ||  || align=right data-sort-value="0.75" | 750 m || 
|-id=916 bgcolor=#E9E9E9
| 574916 ||  || — || December 27, 2014 || Mount Lemmon || Mount Lemmon Survey ||  || align=right | 1.8 km || 
|-id=917 bgcolor=#E9E9E9
| 574917 ||  || — || January 16, 2015 || Mount Lemmon || Mount Lemmon Survey ||  || align=right | 1.6 km || 
|-id=918 bgcolor=#E9E9E9
| 574918 ||  || — || January 23, 2011 || Mount Lemmon || Mount Lemmon Survey ||  || align=right | 1.2 km || 
|-id=919 bgcolor=#E9E9E9
| 574919 ||  || — || January 29, 2011 || Mount Lemmon || Mount Lemmon Survey ||  || align=right data-sort-value="0.87" | 870 m || 
|-id=920 bgcolor=#E9E9E9
| 574920 ||  || — || January 27, 2011 || Mount Lemmon || Mount Lemmon Survey ||  || align=right data-sort-value="0.70" | 700 m || 
|-id=921 bgcolor=#E9E9E9
| 574921 ||  || — || January 28, 2011 || Kitt Peak || Spacewatch ||  || align=right | 1.1 km || 
|-id=922 bgcolor=#d6d6d6
| 574922 ||  || — || November 23, 2009 || Kitt Peak || Spacewatch || 3:2 || align=right | 4.4 km || 
|-id=923 bgcolor=#E9E9E9
| 574923 ||  || — || January 13, 2002 || Palomar || NEAT ||  || align=right | 1.5 km || 
|-id=924 bgcolor=#E9E9E9
| 574924 ||  || — || January 13, 2011 || Kitt Peak || Spacewatch ||  || align=right | 1.5 km || 
|-id=925 bgcolor=#E9E9E9
| 574925 ||  || — || October 23, 2009 || Mount Lemmon || Mount Lemmon Survey ||  || align=right | 1.7 km || 
|-id=926 bgcolor=#E9E9E9
| 574926 ||  || — || February 4, 2011 || Catalina || CSS ||  || align=right | 1.7 km || 
|-id=927 bgcolor=#E9E9E9
| 574927 ||  || — || February 4, 2011 || Mayhill-ISON || L. Elenin ||  || align=right | 1.7 km || 
|-id=928 bgcolor=#E9E9E9
| 574928 ||  || — || February 4, 2011 || Catalina || CSS ||  || align=right | 1.6 km || 
|-id=929 bgcolor=#E9E9E9
| 574929 ||  || — || April 1, 2003 || Apache Point || SDSS Collaboration ||  || align=right | 1.3 km || 
|-id=930 bgcolor=#E9E9E9
| 574930 ||  || — || March 22, 2003 || Ondrejov || L. Kotková ||  || align=right | 1.1 km || 
|-id=931 bgcolor=#E9E9E9
| 574931 ||  || — || February 8, 2011 || Mount Lemmon || Mount Lemmon Survey ||  || align=right data-sort-value="0.78" | 780 m || 
|-id=932 bgcolor=#E9E9E9
| 574932 ||  || — || January 28, 2011 || Mount Lemmon || Mount Lemmon Survey ||  || align=right | 1.1 km || 
|-id=933 bgcolor=#E9E9E9
| 574933 ||  || — || April 21, 2003 || Kitt Peak || Spacewatch ||  || align=right | 1.3 km || 
|-id=934 bgcolor=#E9E9E9
| 574934 ||  || — || February 10, 2011 || Mount Lemmon || Mount Lemmon Survey ||  || align=right | 1.3 km || 
|-id=935 bgcolor=#E9E9E9
| 574935 ||  || — || February 22, 2002 || Palomar || NEAT ||  || align=right | 1.8 km || 
|-id=936 bgcolor=#E9E9E9
| 574936 ||  || — || February 10, 2011 || Mount Lemmon || Mount Lemmon Survey ||  || align=right | 1.5 km || 
|-id=937 bgcolor=#E9E9E9
| 574937 ||  || — || February 26, 2011 || Mount Lemmon || Mount Lemmon Survey ||  || align=right | 1.6 km || 
|-id=938 bgcolor=#E9E9E9
| 574938 ||  || — || February 10, 2011 || Mount Lemmon || Mount Lemmon Survey ||  || align=right | 1.2 km || 
|-id=939 bgcolor=#d6d6d6
| 574939 ||  || — || February 5, 2011 || Haleakala || Pan-STARRS ||  || align=right | 3.2 km || 
|-id=940 bgcolor=#E9E9E9
| 574940 ||  || — || October 24, 2009 || Kitt Peak || Spacewatch ||  || align=right | 1.5 km || 
|-id=941 bgcolor=#E9E9E9
| 574941 ||  || — || September 12, 2004 || Kitt Peak || Spacewatch ||  || align=right | 1.4 km || 
|-id=942 bgcolor=#E9E9E9
| 574942 ||  || — || March 6, 2011 || Mount Lemmon || Mount Lemmon Survey ||  || align=right | 1.7 km || 
|-id=943 bgcolor=#E9E9E9
| 574943 ||  || — || February 25, 2011 || Mount Lemmon || Mount Lemmon Survey ||  || align=right | 1.5 km || 
|-id=944 bgcolor=#E9E9E9
| 574944 ||  || — || February 8, 2011 || Mount Lemmon || Mount Lemmon Survey ||  || align=right | 1.4 km || 
|-id=945 bgcolor=#E9E9E9
| 574945 ||  || — || August 12, 2013 || Haleakala || Pan-STARRS ||  || align=right data-sort-value="0.75" | 750 m || 
|-id=946 bgcolor=#E9E9E9
| 574946 ||  || — || February 4, 2011 || Catalina || CSS ||  || align=right | 1.6 km || 
|-id=947 bgcolor=#E9E9E9
| 574947 ||  || — || February 10, 2011 || Mount Lemmon || Mount Lemmon Survey ||  || align=right | 1.4 km || 
|-id=948 bgcolor=#E9E9E9
| 574948 ||  || — || February 8, 2011 || Mount Lemmon || Mount Lemmon Survey ||  || align=right | 1.6 km || 
|-id=949 bgcolor=#fefefe
| 574949 ||  || — || February 8, 2011 || Mount Lemmon || Mount Lemmon Survey ||  || align=right data-sort-value="0.62" | 620 m || 
|-id=950 bgcolor=#E9E9E9
| 574950 ||  || — || April 1, 2002 || Palomar || NEAT ||  || align=right | 2.3 km || 
|-id=951 bgcolor=#E9E9E9
| 574951 ||  || — || February 13, 2011 || Mount Lemmon || Mount Lemmon Survey ||  || align=right data-sort-value="0.98" | 980 m || 
|-id=952 bgcolor=#E9E9E9
| 574952 ||  || — || September 26, 2000 || Haleakala || AMOS || HNS || align=right | 1.7 km || 
|-id=953 bgcolor=#E9E9E9
| 574953 ||  || — || February 11, 2011 || Mount Lemmon || Mount Lemmon Survey ||  || align=right | 1.3 km || 
|-id=954 bgcolor=#E9E9E9
| 574954 ||  || — || March 26, 2007 || Mount Lemmon || Mount Lemmon Survey || MIS || align=right | 1.8 km || 
|-id=955 bgcolor=#E9E9E9
| 574955 ||  || — || November 22, 2001 || Palomar || NEAT ||  || align=right data-sort-value="0.84" | 840 m || 
|-id=956 bgcolor=#E9E9E9
| 574956 ||  || — || February 25, 2011 || Mount Lemmon || Mount Lemmon Survey ||  || align=right | 1.1 km || 
|-id=957 bgcolor=#E9E9E9
| 574957 ||  || — || September 6, 2008 || Kitt Peak || Spacewatch ||  || align=right | 1.8 km || 
|-id=958 bgcolor=#E9E9E9
| 574958 ||  || — || February 25, 2011 || Mount Lemmon || Mount Lemmon Survey ||  || align=right data-sort-value="0.87" | 870 m || 
|-id=959 bgcolor=#E9E9E9
| 574959 ||  || — || October 23, 2009 || Mount Lemmon || Mount Lemmon Survey ||  || align=right | 1.7 km || 
|-id=960 bgcolor=#d6d6d6
| 574960 ||  || — || March 2, 1995 || Kitt Peak || Spacewatch ||  || align=right | 1.8 km || 
|-id=961 bgcolor=#E9E9E9
| 574961 ||  || — || February 26, 2011 || Mount Lemmon || Mount Lemmon Survey ||  || align=right | 1.0 km || 
|-id=962 bgcolor=#E9E9E9
| 574962 ||  || — || February 26, 2011 || Mount Lemmon || Mount Lemmon Survey ||  || align=right | 2.1 km || 
|-id=963 bgcolor=#E9E9E9
| 574963 ||  || — || April 14, 2016 || Mount Lemmon || Mount Lemmon Survey ||  || align=right | 1.1 km || 
|-id=964 bgcolor=#E9E9E9
| 574964 ||  || — || February 25, 2011 || Mount Lemmon || Mount Lemmon Survey ||  || align=right | 1.9 km || 
|-id=965 bgcolor=#E9E9E9
| 574965 ||  || — || February 25, 2011 || Mount Lemmon || Mount Lemmon Survey ||  || align=right | 1.5 km || 
|-id=966 bgcolor=#fefefe
| 574966 ||  || — || February 26, 2011 || Mount Lemmon || Mount Lemmon Survey ||  || align=right data-sort-value="0.45" | 450 m || 
|-id=967 bgcolor=#E9E9E9
| 574967 ||  || — || February 25, 2011 || Mount Lemmon || Mount Lemmon Survey ||  || align=right | 1.8 km || 
|-id=968 bgcolor=#E9E9E9
| 574968 ||  || — || February 10, 2011 || Mount Lemmon || Mount Lemmon Survey ||  || align=right | 1.7 km || 
|-id=969 bgcolor=#E9E9E9
| 574969 ||  || — || September 16, 2009 || Kitt Peak || Spacewatch || DOR || align=right | 1.5 km || 
|-id=970 bgcolor=#E9E9E9
| 574970 ||  || — || February 10, 2011 || Mount Lemmon || Mount Lemmon Survey ||  || align=right | 2.0 km || 
|-id=971 bgcolor=#E9E9E9
| 574971 ||  || — || March 6, 2011 || Dauban || C. Rinner, F. Kugel ||  || align=right | 3.5 km || 
|-id=972 bgcolor=#E9E9E9
| 574972 ||  || — || February 23, 2011 || Kitt Peak || Spacewatch ||  || align=right | 2.0 km || 
|-id=973 bgcolor=#E9E9E9
| 574973 ||  || — || September 17, 2009 || Kitt Peak || Spacewatch ||  || align=right | 2.1 km || 
|-id=974 bgcolor=#E9E9E9
| 574974 ||  || — || October 29, 2010 || Mount Lemmon || Mount Lemmon Survey ||  || align=right | 1.8 km || 
|-id=975 bgcolor=#E9E9E9
| 574975 ||  || — || August 21, 2008 || Kitt Peak || Spacewatch ||  || align=right | 1.9 km || 
|-id=976 bgcolor=#E9E9E9
| 574976 ||  || — || December 20, 2001 || Kitt Peak || Spacewatch ||  || align=right | 1.5 km || 
|-id=977 bgcolor=#E9E9E9
| 574977 ||  || — || September 25, 2008 || Kitt Peak || Spacewatch ||  || align=right | 2.1 km || 
|-id=978 bgcolor=#fefefe
| 574978 ||  || — || April 13, 2004 || Kitt Peak || Spacewatch ||  || align=right data-sort-value="0.75" | 750 m || 
|-id=979 bgcolor=#E9E9E9
| 574979 ||  || — || February 25, 2011 || Kitt Peak || Spacewatch ||  || align=right | 1.7 km || 
|-id=980 bgcolor=#E9E9E9
| 574980 ||  || — || April 20, 1998 || Socorro || LINEAR ||  || align=right | 1.9 km || 
|-id=981 bgcolor=#E9E9E9
| 574981 ||  || — || March 9, 2011 || Mount Lemmon || Mount Lemmon Survey ||  || align=right | 1.7 km || 
|-id=982 bgcolor=#E9E9E9
| 574982 ||  || — || March 9, 2011 || Kitt Peak || Spacewatch ||  || align=right | 2.1 km || 
|-id=983 bgcolor=#E9E9E9
| 574983 ||  || — || April 13, 2002 || Kitt Peak || Spacewatch ||  || align=right | 1.9 km || 
|-id=984 bgcolor=#E9E9E9
| 574984 ||  || — || March 12, 2011 || Mount Lemmon || Mount Lemmon Survey ||  || align=right | 1.2 km || 
|-id=985 bgcolor=#E9E9E9
| 574985 ||  || — || March 9, 2011 || Mount Lemmon || Mount Lemmon Survey ||  || align=right | 1.7 km || 
|-id=986 bgcolor=#E9E9E9
| 574986 ||  || — || September 15, 2009 || Kitt Peak || Spacewatch ||  || align=right | 2.0 km || 
|-id=987 bgcolor=#E9E9E9
| 574987 ||  || — || September 18, 2009 || Mount Lemmon || Mount Lemmon Survey ||  || align=right | 1.9 km || 
|-id=988 bgcolor=#E9E9E9
| 574988 ||  || — || February 8, 2011 || Mount Lemmon || Mount Lemmon Survey ||  || align=right | 2.2 km || 
|-id=989 bgcolor=#E9E9E9
| 574989 ||  || — || January 28, 2011 || Kitt Peak || Spacewatch ||  || align=right | 1.8 km || 
|-id=990 bgcolor=#E9E9E9
| 574990 ||  || — || January 30, 2011 || Kitt Peak || Spacewatch || EUN || align=right | 1.0 km || 
|-id=991 bgcolor=#E9E9E9
| 574991 ||  || — || April 12, 2002 || Palomar || NEAT || GEF || align=right | 1.7 km || 
|-id=992 bgcolor=#E9E9E9
| 574992 ||  || — || December 29, 2014 || Haleakala || Pan-STARRS ||  || align=right | 1.9 km || 
|-id=993 bgcolor=#fefefe
| 574993 ||  || — || March 4, 2011 || Mount Lemmon || Mount Lemmon Survey ||  || align=right data-sort-value="0.78" | 780 m || 
|-id=994 bgcolor=#E9E9E9
| 574994 ||  || — || March 10, 2011 || Mount Lemmon || Mount Lemmon Survey ||  || align=right | 1.3 km || 
|-id=995 bgcolor=#E9E9E9
| 574995 ||  || — || January 17, 2015 || Haleakala || Pan-STARRS ||  || align=right | 1.6 km || 
|-id=996 bgcolor=#E9E9E9
| 574996 ||  || — || March 10, 2011 || Kitt Peak || Spacewatch ||  || align=right | 1.8 km || 
|-id=997 bgcolor=#E9E9E9
| 574997 ||  || — || January 25, 2015 || Haleakala || Pan-STARRS ||  || align=right | 2.1 km || 
|-id=998 bgcolor=#d6d6d6
| 574998 ||  || — || May 22, 2012 || Kitt Peak || Spacewatch ||  || align=right | 2.9 km || 
|-id=999 bgcolor=#E9E9E9
| 574999 ||  || — || May 23, 2012 || Mount Lemmon || Mount Lemmon Survey ||  || align=right | 1.5 km || 
|-id=000 bgcolor=#E9E9E9
| 575000 ||  || — || March 14, 2011 || Mount Lemmon || Mount Lemmon Survey ||  || align=right | 1.6 km || 
|}

References

External links 
 Discovery Circumstances: Numbered Minor Planets (570001)–(575000) (IAU Minor Planet Center)

0574